= List of Middlesex cricket captains =

Middlesex County Cricket Club have appointed 38 permanent club captains since their foundation in 1864.

== Official captains ==
No.	Name	Nationality	Years	First	Last	FC	LA	T20	Total	Refs
1	Teddy Walker	England	1864–1872	1864	1877	–	–	–	–	
2	Isaac Walker	England	1873–1884	1864	1884	–	-	-	–	
3	Alexander Webbe	England	1885–1897; 1898	1875	1900	–	–	–	–	
4	Andrew Stoddart	England	1898	1885	1900	–	-	-	–	
5	Gregor MacGregor	England	1898–1907	1892	1907	–	–	–	–	
6	Plum Warner	England	1908–1920	1894	1920	–	-	-	–	
7	Frank Mann	England	1921–1928	1909	1931	–	–	–	–	
8	Nigel Haig	England	1929–1932; 1933–1934	1912	1934	–	-	-	–	
9	Tom Enthoven	England	1933–1934	1925	1936	–	-	-	–	
10	Walter Robins	England	1935–1938; 1946–1947; 1950	1925	1951	–	-	-	–	
11	Ian Peebles	England	1939	1928	1948	–	-	-	–	
12	George Mann	England	1948–1949	1937	1954	–	-	-	–	
13	Denis Compton	England	1951–1952	1936	1958	–	-	-	–	
14	Bill Edrich	England	1951–1952; 1953–1957	1937	1958	–	-	-	–	
15	John Warr	England	1958–1960	1949	1960	–	-	-	–	
16	Ian Bedford	England	1961–1962	1947	1962	–	-	-	–	
17	Colin Drybrough	England	1963–1964	1958	1964	–	-	-	–	
18	Fred Titmus	England	1965–1968	1949	1982	–	-	-	–	
19	Peter Parfitt	England	1969–1970	1956	1972	–	-	-	–	
20	Mike Brearley	England	1971–1982	1961	1983	–	-	-	–	
21	Mike Gatting	England	1983–1997	1975	1998	–	-	-	–	
22	Mark Ramprakash	England	1997–1999	1987	2000	–	-	-	–	
23	Justin Langer	Australia	2000	1998	2000	–	-	-	–	
24	Angus Fraser	England	2001–2002	1984	2002	–	-	-	–	
25	Andrew Strauss	England	2002–2004	1998	2012	–	-	-	–	
26	Ben Hutton	England	2005–2006	1998	2007	–	-	-	–	
27	Ed Smith	England	2007–2008	2005	2008	–	-	-	–	
28	Shaun Udal	England	2009–2010	2008	2010	–	-	-	–	
29	Neil Dexter	England	2010–2013	2008	2015	–	-	-	–	
30	Chris Rogers	Australia	2014	2011	2014	–	-	-	–	
31	Adam Voges	Australia	2015–2016	2013	2017	–	-	-	–	
32	James Franklin	New Zealand	2017	2015	2018	–	-	-	–	
33	Dawid Malan	England	2018-2019	2006	2019	–	–	-	-	
34	Stephen Eskinazi	England	2020	2015	to date	-	-	-	-	
35	Peter Handscomb	Australia	2021	2021	2022	-	-	-	-	
36	Tim Murtagh	Ireland	2022	2007	2023	-	-	-	-	
37	Toby Roland-Jones	England	2023-2025	2010	to date	-	-	-	-	
38	Leus du Plooy	South Africa	2025 to date	2024	to date	-	-	-	-	
