= Norman Cowans =

English cricketer

Personal information
- Full name: Norman George Cowans
- Born: 17 April 1961 (age 65); St. Mary, Jamaica
- Nickname: Flash
- Batting: Right-handed
- Bowling: Right-arm fast
- Role: Bowler

Domestic team information
- Years: Team
- 1980–1993: Middlesex
- 1993–1995: Hampshire

Career statistics
Competition	Test	ODI	FC	LA
Matches	19	23	239	224
Runs scored	175	13	1,605	281
Batting average	7.95	2.60	8.91	5.62
100s/50s	0/0	0/0	0/1	0/0
Top score	36	4*	66	27
Balls bowled	3,452	1,282	33,023	11128
Wickets	51	23	662	263
Bowling average	39.27	39.69	24.86	27.33
5 wickets in innings	2	0	23	1
10 wickets in match	0	0	1	0
Best bowling	6/77	3/44	6/31	6/9
Catches/stumpings	9/–	5/–	63/–	40/-
- Source: CricInfo, 26 November 2017

Norman George Cowans (born 17 April 1961) is a former cricketer who mainly played as a right-arm fast bowler. He was the 500th cricketer to play Test cricket for England, featuring between 1982 and 1985 in 19 Test matches and 23 One Day Internationals. Cowans also played first-class and List A cricket for both Middlesex and Hampshire.

He won four County Championship titles along with four limited-overs titles with Middlesex. Andrew Miller of CricInfo described him as "an integral member of the most successful Middlesex team of all time." Cowans picked up a sum of 532 first-class and 212 List A wickets in a combined 362 appearances for the said side.

== Life and career ==
Born at Enfield in Saint Mary Parish, Jamaica, Cowans moved to England with his family when he was just seven years old. At first he worked as a member of the groundstaff at Lord's then joined and in 1981 made his debut for Middlesex. After claiming, at the age of 21, 43 first class wickets for the club, he was picked for England's defence of the Ashes in Australia in 1982/83. On that tour he had a dismal showing and was underbowled by captain, Bob Willis, until the crucial Fourth Test at Melbourne. This was a match England had to win if they had any hope of retaining the Ashes they won in 1981 at home.

Cowans played the game of his life at the MCG in 1982, where he took a match-winning 6 for 77, following his first innings 2 for 69 (which included the first-ball scalp of Greg Chappell), in England's dramatic three-run victory. This victory sent the series to Sydney for the deciding Fifth Test, which ended in a draw, meaning Australia regained the Ashes. The Wisden review of the tour observed: "In retrospect Willis may have felt that more could and should have been made of Norman Cowans's bowling".

The following summer Cowans was in the England squad for the 1983 Cricket World Cup, and although he only played one match in the tournament, he helped England to win a subsequent test series against New Zealand. The following winter Cowans took his second and last five-wicket haul in Tests, helping to derail a Pakistan run chase with three wickets in an over. England lost this series, but the following winter Cowans was on the winning side, and he played in every test as David Gower's team surprised India. This was Cowans' most lucrative series, and he took 14 wickets, including two at the start of India's second innings in the Delhi Test, a result that at the time "ended England's longest-ever spell without a victory".

Cowans played for England for the last time in the 1985 Ashes, assisting England's victory in the 1st Test at Leeds by extending England's first-innings lead by 49 in a last-wicket stand with Paul Downton and taking the wickets of David Boon and Allan Border. In this series England would regain the Ashes lost in 1982-3, and it would be their last victory in a home Ashes series for 20 years. Although he toured Sri Lanka with an England 'B' side that winter, taking 6 for 50 in the last unofficial 'Test', He played his best Test cricket away from England (he averaged ten runs fewer a wicket overseas). but was not again picked for the three lions.

He was however part of a successful Middlesex team, bowling alongside Wayne Daniel, Simon Hughes, Neil Williams, and, eventually Angus Fraser. A highlight of his county career came in 1983 when he claimed 4 for 33, and won the man of the match award, in the semi-final of the Benson and Hedges Cup. He later took 4 for 39 to help Middlesex win the final and claim the tournament's trophy. During the 1990 and 1993 season he was a part of the Middlesex sides that won the County Championship, topping the first-class bowling averages in the latter season with 16 wickets at 14.62. He eventually won four County Championship titles, in 1982, 1985, 1990, and 1993, along with four limited-overs titles in his fifteen seasons with Middlesex. Andrew Miller of CricInfo described him as "an integral member of the most successful Middlesex team of all time." Cowans also picked up 532 first class and 212 list a wickets in a total of 362 appearances for the said side.

== Personal life ==
Cowans is the owner of a sports promotion business. He also works as a DJ in his spare time.
