= Kenneth Came =

English cricketer and British Army officer

Personal information
- Full name: Kenneth Charles Came
- Born: 29 October 1925; Caversham, Berkshire, England
- Died: 29 January 1986 (aged 60); Up Nately, Hampshire, England
- Batting: Left-handed
- Bowling: Right-arm medium
- Relatives: Walter Robins (father-in-law); Charles Robins (brother-in-law)

Domestic team information
- Years: Team
- 1957: Free Foresters
- 1956–1957: Berkshire

Career statistics
Competition	First-class
Matches	1
Runs scored	12
Batting average	6.00
100s/50s	–/–
Top score	6
Balls bowled	90
Wickets	–
Bowling average	–
5 wickets in innings	–
10 wickets in match	–
Best bowling	–
Catches/stumpings	1/–
- Source: Cricinfo, 22 November 2011

Brigadier Kenneth Charles Came OBE (29 October 1925 – 29 January 1986) was a career British Army officer and English cricketer. He was born at Caversham, Berkshire.

== Military career ==
Came was drafted into the British Army as an Emergency Commission following World War II. In December 1946 he was serving with the Royal Hampshire Regiment and held the rank of 2nd Lieutenant. The following year, in November 1947, he was promoted to Lieutenant. In August 1952, he was promoted to captain, while still serving in the Royal Hampshire Regiment. His next promotion followed in October 1959, when he was promoted to major, this time serving with the Parachute Regiment. He was later promoted from Major to the rank of lieutenant-colonel in 1966. The following year he was appointed a member of the Most Excellent Order of the British Empire. 1970 saw Came promoted to colonel, while three years later he gained promotion to brigadier. Having also been the aide-de-camp to Queen Elizabeth II since 1978, Came retired from the army in November 1980. His association with the Parachute Regiment continued after his retirement, when in 1982 he was appointed the Honorary Colonel of the 4th Battalion, Parachute Regiment.

== Cricket career ==
A left-handed batsman and right-arm medium pace bowler, Came made his debut for Berkshire in the 1956 Minor Counties Championship against Cornwall. He played Minor counties cricket for Berkshire in 1956 and 1957, making nine appearances. In 1957, Came made a single first-class appearance for the Free Foresters against Oxford University at the University Parks. He opened the bowling during this match in both of Oxford University's innings, though went wicketless. With the bat, he was dismissed for 6 runs in the Free Foresters first-innings by Richard Jowett, while in their second-innings he was dismissed for the same score by Michael Mathews. He also made two appearances for the Army in 1957, though these were not rated as first-class.

== Personal life ==
Came married the daughter of Test cricketer Walter Robins, so Robins' son Charles was his brother-in-law. He died at Up Nately, Hampshire, on 29 January 1986.
