= International cricket in 1954 =

International cricket season

The 1954 International cricket season was from April to August 1954.

== Season overview ==
International tours
Start date	Home team	Away team	Results [Matches]			
Start date	Home team	Away team	Test	ODI	FC	LA
10 June 1954	England	Pakistan	1–1 [4]	—	—	—
4 August 1954	England	Canada	—	—	1–0 [3]	—
9 August 1954	Netherlands	England	—	—	1–1 [4]	—
18 August 1954	Pakistan	Canada	—	—	1–0 [1]	—
28 August 1954	Denmark	England	—	—	0–1 [1]	—

== June ==
=== Pakistan in England ===
Test series
No.	Date	Home captain	Away captain	Venue	Result
Test 387	10–15 June	Leonard Hutton	Abdul Kardar	Lord's, London	Match drawn
Test 388	1–5 July	David Sheppard	Abdul Kardar	Old Trafford Cricket Ground, Manchester	England by an innings and 129 runs
Test 389	22–27 July	David Sheppard	Abdul Kardar	Kennington Oval, London	Match drawn
Test 390	12–17 August	Leonard Hutton	Abdul Kardar	Trent Bridge, Nottingham	Pakistan by 24 runs

== August ==
=== Canada in England ===
3-day Match series
No.	Date	Home captain	Away captain	Venue	Result
Match 1	4–6 August	(Essex) Trevor Bailey	Basil Robinson	Vista Road Recreation Ground, Clacton-on-Sea	Match drawn
Match 2	7–10 August	(Warwickshire) John Thomson	Basil Robinson	Edgbaston Cricket Ground, Birmingham	Match drawn
Match 3	28–30 August	(Yorkshire) Norman Yardley	Basil Robinson	North Marine Road Ground, Scarborough	Yorkshire by 249 runs

=== England in Netherlands ===
One Day Match series
No.	Date	Home captain	Away captain	Venue	Result
Match 1	9 August	Not mentioned	Not mentioned	Amstelveen	Match drawn
Match 2	10 August	Not mentioned	Not mentioned	Amstelveen	Netherlands by 23 runs
2-Day Match series
No.	Date	Home captain	Away captain	Venue	Result
Match 1	12–13 August	Not mentioned	George Newman	Haarlem	Match drawn
Match 2	14–15 August	Not mentioned	George Newman	The Hague	Free Foresters by 69 runs

=== Pakistan vs Canada in England ===
2-day Match
No.	Date	Home captain	Away captain	Venue	Result
Match	18–19 August	Abdul Kardar	Basil Robinson	Lord's, London	Pakistan by an innings and 67 runs

=== England in Denmark ===
2-day Match series
No.	Date	Home captain	Away captain	Venue	Result
Match	4–6 August	Not mentioned	Charles Williams	AB Ground, Copenhagen	Oxford University by an innings and 32 runs
