= John Pelham Mann =

English business executive, cricketer, and British Army officer

John Pelham Mann MC (13 June 1919 – 8 September 2002) was an English business executive, cricketer and decorated British Army officer.

John Mann was born in West Byfleet, Surrey, the younger son of England and Middlesex cricket captain Frank Mann. His brother was George Mann, who also captained England.

He was educated at Eton and Pembroke College, Cambridge. A right-handed batsman, he missed his cricket blue due to illness, but he was considered an exciting prospect before the Second World War broke out. He played in fifteen first-class matches for Middlesex between 1939 and 1947, being awarded his county cap in 1946.

During the Second World War, Mann served as an officer in the Scots Guards. He won the Military Cross as an acting major. He was in command of "Left Flank" Squadron of the 3rd Tank Battalion Scots Guards, part of 6 Guards Tank Brigade, during the advance towards Sevenum, east of Eindhoven. Mann's squadron attacked some well hidden anti-tank guns at night and forced them to withdraw.

He was managing director of Unilever in New Zealand in the 1950s. He joined United Biscuits in 1964, and became the company's chief executive in the United States. He retired in 1985 to live in Connecticut.

In 1942 he married Ann Brockbank; they were divorced in 1974. He married Isabel Davis (née Ochsner) in 1976. She survived him, together with two sons and a daughter from his first marriage and three stepsons.
