= William Robins (cricketer) =

English cricketer and British Army officer

Personal information
- Full name: William Vernon Harry Robins
- Born: 29 May 1907; Stafford, Staffordshire, England
- Died: 26 June 1990 (aged 83); Congleton, Cheshire, England
- Batting: Left-handed
- Bowling: Leg break googly
- Relatives: Walter Robins (brother); Charles Robins (nephew)

Domestic team information
- Years: Team
- 1937/38–1938/39: Europeans (India)
- 1937/38–1938/39: Madras
- 1931: Staffordshire

Career statistics
Competition	First-class
Matches	8
Runs scored	207
Batting average	17.25
100s/50s	–/1
Top score	60
Balls bowled	779
Wickets	15
Bowling average	37.53
5 wickets in innings	–
10 wickets in match	–
Best bowling	4/36
Catches/stumpings	3/–
- Source: Cricinfo, 28 September 2018

William Vernon Harry Robins DSO (29 May 1907 – 26 June 1990) was an English first-class cricketer and British Army officer. He was the brother of the Test cricketer Walter Robins.

== Early life and early cricket ==
Born at Stafford in May 1907, Robins was educated at University College School, where he played in the cricket eleven. After leaving school he attended the Royal Military College at Sandhurst, graduating in September 1927, from where he was posted to the King's Own Regiment with the rank of second lieutenant. He was promoted to lieutenant in the same regiment on 1 September 1930. During a ceremony at Edinburgh Castle on 1 August 1931, Robins carried one of the colours of Barrell's Regiment, an ancestor regiment of the King's Own; these colours had been carried by the regiment at the Battle of Culloden and the ceremony united them with the standard of Clan Stewart of Appin – who had fought on the Jacobite side. The colours remain in the collection of the National Museum of Scotland.

Robins played minor counties cricket for Staffordshire in 1931, playing two matches in the Minor Counties Championship. In that same year he made his debut in first-class cricket for the British Army against Oxford University at Folkestone, with Robins also playing an inter-services first-class match in 1931 for the Army against the Royal Air Force at The Oval. His next appearances in first-class cricket came when he played twice for the Combined Services in 1937. Robins received promotion to captain in the King's Own Regiment on 12 February 1937 and was appointed the regiment's adjutant on 5 February 1939.

== Posting to India and WWII service ==
His military career took him to British India, where he featured in first-class matches in 1938 and 1939, playing twice for the Europeans and twice for Madras. These matches marked his final appearances in first-class cricket. Across eight first-class matches, Robins scored 207 runs with a high score of 60, also taking 15 wickets with his leg break googly bowling, at an average of 37.53 and best figures of 4/36. Robins served with his regiment in the Second World War and was promoted to the war substantive rank of major, before receiving a full promotion to that rank on 1 September 1944. Robins was awarded the Distinguished Service Order for gallantry during the spring 1945 offensive in Italy, by which time he held the rank of temporary lieutenant colonel in the King's Royal Rifle Corps. He was further mentioned in dispatches for his service in Italy on 29 November 1945 – he had returned to the King's Own Regiment by this time.

On 25 January 1949 Robins was promoted to lieutenant-colonel and transferred to command the King's Regiment. Robins relinquished command of the regiment on 25 January 1952 and was placed on the supernumerary list of officers. Robins retired from the army on 13 January 1955 and was granted the honorary rank of colonel. Robins died at Congleton, Cheshire, on 26 June 1990.

== Honours and awards ==
- 26 April 1945 – Lieutenant-Colonel (Temporary) William Vernon Harry Robins (38748) The King's Royal Rifle Corps was awarded the Distinguished Service Order in recognition of gallant and distinguished service in Italy.

On the evening of 11 Nov 2 Kings commanded by Lt.Col. WVH ROBINS came under command of 12 Inf Bde. During the next four days the battalion advanced a distance of 5 miles for FORLI 4316 to R. MONTONE against stubborn enemy opposition. The axis of the battalion lay over country ideal suited for delaying actions. Every house used by the enemy as a strongpoint was strongly defended. To obtain an advance in these conditions called for first class planning and leadership. Throughout, Lt.Col. Robins' zeal and direction were first class and were undoubtedly responsible for the success of the operation. He continually moved about the forward area under enemy shell and small arms fire inspiring in his battalion a vigoorous offensive spirit which carried it forward against all opposition. The success of the battalion's four days fighting, the many enemy dead, together with a considerable number of prisoners captured are all evidence of this officer's fine powers of command and gallant leadership.

— Distinguished Service Order (DSO), 1923-2010, Naval & Military Press.

- 29 November 1945 – mentioned in dispatches for service in Italy.
