= George Mann (cricketer) =

English cricketer (1917–2001)

George Mann CBE DSO MC
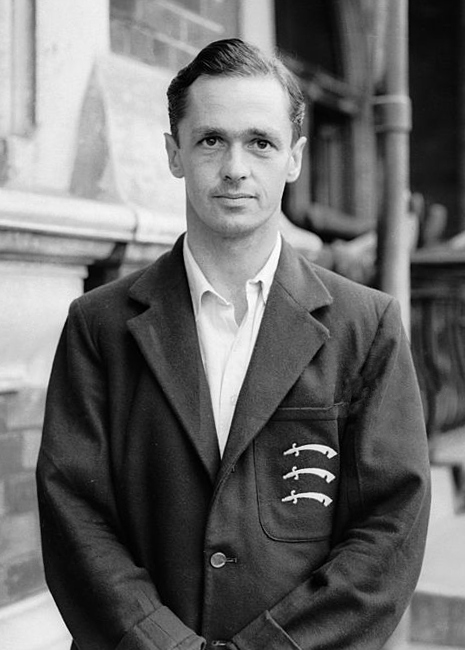
- Major George Mann at Lord's in 1947

Personal information
- Full name: Francis George Mann
- Born: 6 September 1917; Byfleet, Surrey, England
- Died: 8 August 2001 (aged 83); Stockcross, Berkshire, England
- Batting: Right-handed
- Relatives: Sir John Mann, 2nd Baronet (uncle); Frank Mann (father); John Pelham Mann (brother); Simon Mann (son)

International information
- National side: England
- Test debut: 16 December 1948 v South Africa
- Last Test: 28 June 1949 v New Zealand

Career statistics
Competition	Test	First-class
Matches	7	166
Runs scored	376	6,350
Batting average	37.60	25.91
100s/50s	1/0	7/32
Top score	136*	136*
Balls bowled	–	414
Wickets	–	3
Bowling average	–	129.66
5 wickets in innings	–	0
10 wickets in match	–	0
Best bowling	–	2/16
Catches/stumpings	3/–	72/–
- Source: CricInfo, 29 July 2020

Francis George Mann CBE, DSO, MC (6 September 1917 – 8 August 2001), was an English Test cricket captain, who played for Cambridge University, MCC, Middlesex and England. A member of the Mann baronets brewing family, he was also a decorated Army officer.

As a cricketer, George Mann was a right-handed middle-order batsman. His father, Frank Mann, also captained England, making them the first father and son to both captain England. Colin and Chris Cowdrey are the only other father and son to be so honoured.

== Early life and education ==
Born in 1917 at Byfleet, Surrey, the elder son of Frank Mann and Enid Tilney (died 1976), only daughter of Commander George Adams Tilney RN, his younger brother was John Pelham Mann. Owners of the brewery Watney Mann, he was in remainder to the family title created for his grandfather Sir Edward Mann, 1st Baronet.

Mann was educated at Eton College, an all-boys public school, where he captained the school's cricket XI in 1936, and joined the Eton College Contingent Officers' Training Corps as a cadet under-officer. He then went up to Pembroke College, Cambridge, graduating with a Bachelor of Arts (BA) degree. Whilst at Cambridge, he was awarded two cricket blues playing for Cambridge University Cricket Club in 1938 and 1939.

== Military service ==
Mann served in the British Army during the Second World War, having joined up prior to its outbreak. Commissioned, on 8 July 1939, into the Royal Welch Fusiliers as a second lieutenant, he was transferred to the Scots Guards on 13 March 1940. Awarded the Military Cross (MC) in 1942, on 28 June 1945, Captain (temporary Major) Mann was appointed a Companion of the Distinguished Service Order (DSO) "in recognition of gallant and distinguished services in Italy".

Continuing his military service after the War, on 8 July 1949, he was transferred from the Supplementary Reserve to the Regular Army Reserve of Officers as an honorary major. Upon reaching the age limit, Major Mann resigned his commission on 6 September 1967 being permitted to retain his honorary rank.

== Cricketing career ==
Mann captained England in each of his seven Test matches, winning two and drawing the other five; his father had also been captain in every Test he played. Wisden said of Mann: "as a captain he was ideal, zealous to a degree, and considerate in all things at all times". After leading England in South Africa in 1948/49, Mann captained two Tests the following summer, before he stood down citing inability to participate regularly due to family brewing commercial commitments (Mann, Crossman & Paulin).

Chairman of the Test and County Cricket Board (TCCB) from 1978 to 1983, he was in office during the controversy over the rebel tour, led by Geoff Boycott and Graham Gooch, to South Africa in 1982. Mann wore several hats, but he "handled this assorted millinery with … diplomacy and charm".

Appointed CBE in 1983, Mann served as President of Marylebone Cricket Club for 1984/85.

== Business interests ==
Mann was a main board director of Mann, Crossman & Paulin, retaining his position on the new company board (Watney Mann) when the family brewery merged with Watney Combe & Reid in 1958.

Master of the Brewers' Company for 1960/61, he also served as non-exec Deputy Chairman of the Extel Group from 1980 to 1986.

== Personal life ==
In 1949, Mann married Margaret Hildegarde Marshall Clark, elder daughter of Colonel William Marshall Clark OBE CStJ, having three sons and one daughter.

Mann lived at Great Farm on the West Woodhay estate with his wife who predeceased him in 1995, and died on 8 August 2001 at Stockcross, Berkshire.

Their eldest son, Captain Simon Mann (ex-SAS), was sentenced for thirty-four years in Equatorial Guinea in 2008, on charges related to an attempted coup in 2004, before being pardoned on 2 November 2009.

== Honours ==
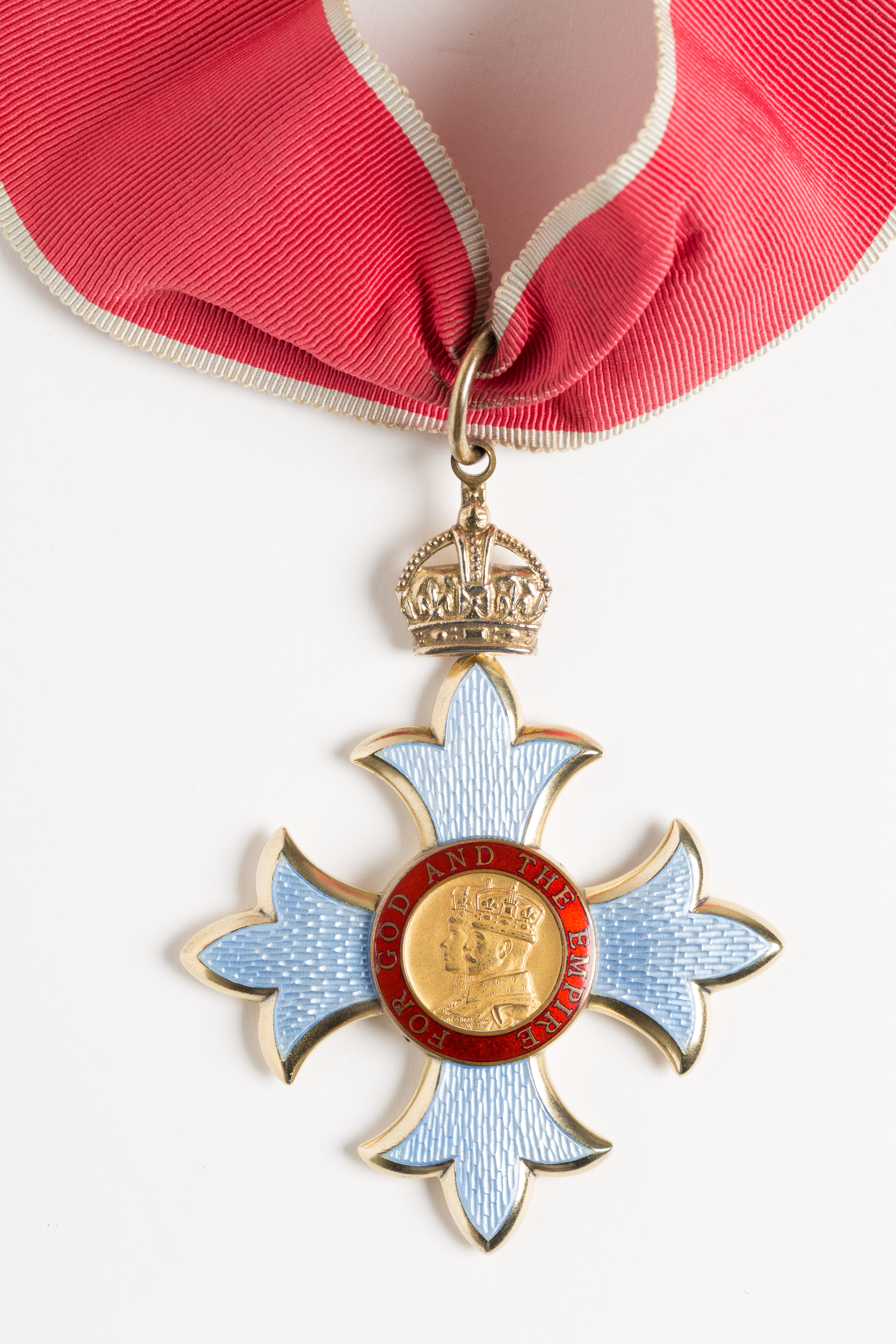
CBE insignia

Among other honours and decorations, Mann received :

- – CBE (1983)
- – DSO (1945)
- – MC (1942)

== Arms ==
Coat of arms of Major George Mann
Crest A Demi-Man in profile in armour Proper the Helmet adorned with four Feathers Argent holding in the dexter hand a Cross moline Gules Helm That of a Gentleman Escutcheon Argent a Chevron Sable between in chief two Crosses moline and in base an Annulet Gules Motto Homme d'État Orders Surrounding the Shield, the Order of the British Empire Circlet: Other elements As a Master Brewer, Mann could impale the Brewers' arms (dexter) with his family arms (sinister):

== See also ==
- Mann baronets

Sporting positions
Preceded by Norman Yardley	English national cricket Captain; 1948/9–1949	Succeeded by Freddie Brown
Preceded by Walter Robins	Middlesex County Cricket Captain; 1948–1949	Succeeded by Walter Robins
