= Tom Harrison (cricketer) =

English cricketer (born 1971)

- Born: 11 December 1971 (age 54); Peterborough, Cambridgeshire, England
- Education: Oundle School, Northamptonshire, United Kingdom
- Alma mater: University of Manchester
- Occupation: Sports executive
- Known for: CEO of Six Nations Rugby; CEO of the England and Wales Cricket Board

Tom Harrison (born 11 December 1971) is a British former professional cricketer and sports executive. He played cricket with Northamptonshire and Derbyshire. Harrison was CEO of the England and Wales Cricket Board from January 2015 to May 2022. Since April 2023 he has served as CEO of Six Nations Rugby.

== Early life and education ==
Harrison was born in England. He was raised in South Africa until fourteen, after which he attended Oundle School, in Northamptonshire, followed by the University of Manchester.

== Life and career ==
Harrison was Senior Vice President for the sports agency, IMG, where he managed the company's media business in the UK and Ireland. Prior to that, Harrison ran IMG's media business in the Indian sub-continent for two years. He was also responsible for IMG's global cricket business and for global media rights sales for Cricket Australia, Cricket South Africa and the Indian Premier League.

Harrison spent five years living in Asia, working with the pan-Asian broadcaster and leading investors in global cricket rights, ESPN STAR Sports where he was responsible for rights syndication across all sports rights. A former captain of Middlesex Premier League side, Teddington CC, Tom was previously ECB's Head of Marketing from 2003 to 2006. Harrison stepped down as CEO of the ECB in May 2022. He was appointed in January 2023 as CEO of Six Nations Rugby and will begin his tenure in April 2023.

Sporting positions
Preceded by David Collier	England and Wales Cricket Board Chief Executive; 2015–2022	Succeeded by Clare Connor (interim)
