= 1983 Benson & Hedges Cup =

- Administrator: Test and County Cricket Board
- Cricket format: Limited overs cricket (55 overs per innings)
- Champions: Middlesex (1st title)
- Participants: 20
- Matches: 47
- Most runs: 342 Graham Gooch (Essex)
- Most wickets: 12 Stuart Turner (Essex) and Derek Pringle (Essex)

The 1983 Benson & Hedges Cup was the twelfth edition of cricket's Benson & Hedges Cup.

The competition was won by Middlesex County Cricket Club.

== Fixtures and results ==
=== Group stage ===
==== Group A ====
Team	Pld	W	L	NR	A	Pts	BowSR
Gloucestershire	4	3	0	1	0	7	33,731
Northamptonshire	4	2	1	1	0	5	37,233
Leicestershire	4	1	1	1	1	4	48,923
Worcestershire	4	1	2	1	0	2	36,696
Scotland	4	0	3	0	1	0	50,733

==== Group B ====
Team	Pld	W	L	NR	A	Pts	BowSR
Lancashire	4	2	0	2	0	6	37,231
Warwickshire	4	2	0	1	1	6	39,333
Nottinghamshire	4	2	1	0	1	5	39,955
Derbyshire	4	0	2	1	1	2	49,765
Yorkshire	4	0	3	0	1	1	48,053

==== Group C ====
Team	Pld	W	L	NR	A	Pts	BowSR
Essex	4	3	1	0	0	6	33,243
Hampshire	4	3	1	0	0	6	35,514
Sussex	4	2	2	0	0	4	45,929
Somerset	4	1	2	0	1	3	34,107
Minor Counties	4	0	3	0	1	0	82,500

==== Group D ====
Team	Pld	W	L	NR	A	Pts	BowSR
Kent	4	3	1	0	0	6	35,061
Middlesex	4	2	0	0	2	6	50,000
Glamorgan	4	1	1	1	1	4	39,353
Surrey	4	1	2	1	0	3	41,167
Oxford and Cambridge Universities	4	0	3	0	1	0	43,455

=== Quarter-finals ===
1, 2, 3 June 1983
(scorecard)

Essex; 231/8 (55 overs)	v	Warwickshire; 168 all out (50.3 overs)
Keith Fletcher 87; Bob Willis 3/51 (11 overs)		Dennis Amiss 49; Norbert Phillip 4/33 (9.3 overs)

Essex won by 63 runs
County Ground, Chelmsford
Umpires: Bill Alley & Arthur Jepson
Player of the match: Derek Pringle (Essex)

- Two reserve days used. No play first day. Warwickshire were 30/0 (13.4 overs) at the close of the first reserve day's play.

1, 2, 3 June 1983
(scorecard)

Gloucestershire; 12/0 (4 overs)	v	Middlesex
Andy Stovold 11*

No result (Middlesex won on toss of a coin)
County Ground, Bristol
Umpires: Ray Julian & Ken Palmer
Player of the match: None

- Two reserve days used. Gloucestershire were 12/0 (4 overs) at the close of the first day's play. No play on either reserve day.

1, 2 June 1983
(scorecard)

Kent; 198/9 (55 overs)	v	Hampshire; 193/9 (55 overs)
Neil Taylor 47; Malcolm Marshall 4/26 (11 overs)		Paul Terry 72; Richard Ellison 3/22 (11 overs)

Kent won by 5 runs
St Lawrence Ground, Canterbury
Umpires: Dickie Bird & Jack Birkenshaw
Player of the match: Richard Ellison (Kent)

- Reserve day used. No play first day.

1, 2, 3 June 1983
(scorecard)

Lancashire; 290/5 (55 overs)	v	Northamptonshire; 154/9 (55 overs)
Graeme Fowler 97; Tim Lamb 2/54 (11 overs)		Kapil Dev 49; Paul Allott 2/25 (7.1 overs)

Lancashire won by 107 runs
Old Trafford, Manchester
Umpires: Barrie Meyer & Don Oslear
Player of the match: Graeme Fowler (Lancashire)

- Two reserve days used. Lancashire were 186/2 (42.4 overs) at the close of the first day's play. No play first reserve day.

=== Semi-finals ===
6 July 1983
(scorecard)

Kent; 128 all out (51 overs)	v	Essex; 130/1 (46 overs)
Bob Woolmer 33; John Lever 3/29 (11 overs)		Brian Hardie 58*; Richard Ellison 1/23 (11 overs)

Essex won by 9 wickets
St Lawrence Ground, Canterbury
Umpires: Roy Palmer & Alan Whitehead
Player of the match: Stuart Turner (Essex)

6 July 1983
(scorecard)

Lancashire; 90 all out (31.5 overs)	v	Middlesex; 91/4 (30.2 overs)
David Hughes 27; Norman Cowans 4/33 (11 overs)		Clive Radley 32*; Paul Allott 2/23 (11 overs)

Middlesex won by 6 wickets
Lord's, London
Umpires: Barrie Leadbeater & David Shepherd
Player of the match: Norman Cowans (Middlesex)

=== Final ===
23 July 1983
(scorecard)

Middlesex; 196/8 (55 overs)	v	Essex; 192 all out (54.1 overs)
Clive Radley 89; Neil Foster 3/26 (11 overs)		Brian Hardie 49; Norman Cowans 4/39 (10.1 overs)

Middlesex won by 4 runs
Lord's, London
Umpires: Dickie Bird & Barrie Meyer
Player of the match: Clive Radley (Middlesex)

== See also ==
Benson & Hedges Cup
