= Neil Williams (cricketer) =

English cricketer (1962–2006)

Personal information
- Full name: Neil Fitzgerald Williams
- Born: 2 July 1962; St Vincent, Windward Islands
- Died: 27 March 2006 (aged 43); Kingstown, St. Vincent
- Batting: Right-handed
- Bowling: Right-arm fast-medium

International information
- National side: England
- Only Test: 23 August 1990 v India

Career statistics
Competition	Test	First-class
Matches	1	255
Runs scored	38	4,457
Batting average	38.00	18.64
100s/50s	0/0	0/13
Top score	38	77
Balls bowled	246	37,485
Wickets	2	675
Bowling average	74.00	30.29
5 wickets in innings	0	22
10 wickets in match	0	2
Best bowling	2/148	8/75
Catches/stumpings	0/–	67/–
- Source: CricInfo, 30 December 2021

Neil Fitzgerald Williams (2 July 1962 – 27 March 2006) was an England cricketer, who played first-class cricket for both Middlesex and Essex. In a first-class career spanning over seventeen years, he took 675 wickets and scored 4,457 runs.

== Life and career ==
Williams was born on 2 July 1962 in St Vincent and emigrated to Britain when he was 13. He joined Middlesex after a season-and-a-half as an MCC Young Professional during which time he had been playing for Hornsey. A deeply religious man, when he first arrived at Lord's, he refused to play on Sundays. He made his county debut in 1982. A brisk bowler with good accuracy and late away-swing, he was a key part of four County Championship-winning sides (1982, 1985, 1990, 1993). He also picked up winners' medals in the 1983 Benson & Hedges Cup and the 1992 Sunday League. In 1995, following a successful benefit, he moved to Essex where he played until 1998. He also played three seasons for Windward Islands and one season with Tasmania in 1983–84. He was part of an "English Counties XI" tour of Zimbabwe in 1984–5, impressing in one fixture against Zimbabwe, in which he took 7 for 55 in the first innings and 10 for 119 in the match (his victims including a young Graeme Hick).

His Test call-up for the last Test of 1990 against India at The Oval came when Chris Lewis withdrew with a migraine. Williams took 2 for 148 (the victims were Sachin Tendulkar and Mohammad Azharuddin) as India racked up a huge score. On the second evening of the match, after Michael Atherton was out cheaply, he was sent out as a nightwatchman, a successful move as he scored 38. However, with England forced to follow on and their batters batting out time to secure a draw, Williams had no further chance to contribute to the game and was never called up by England again. Ironically this meant that he ended his test career with a better batting average than would Atherton (who went onto play 115 Tests for England), as well as a better bowling average, and as many Test wickets.

Mike Brearley, his first captain at Middlesex, said he was a "modest, unassuming person who always did his absolute best for the team," while Christopher Martin-Jenkins described him as a "courteous, friendly man brought up to believe in the precious traditions of fair play". Former team-mate Angus Fraser - who played alongside Williams at Middlesex and in his only test match - said that he was "a very talented bowler who, in another era and had he not picked up so many injuries, may have played for England a few more times."

After retiring he took up coaching and was the coach of St Vincent's Academy for Kids at the time of his death. He died of pneumonia, in St Vincent, three weeks after suffering a stroke. He was 43 years old.

== See also ==
- One Test Wonder
