= Joe Murrell =

English cricketer and footballer

Personal information
- Full name: Harry Robert Murrell
- Born: 19 November 1879; Hounslow, Middlesex
- Died: 15 August 1952 (aged 72); West Wickham, Kent
- Batting: Right-handed
- Role: Wicket-keeper

Domestic team information
- Years: Team
- 1899–1905: Kent
- 1906–1926: Middlsex
- FC debut: 26 June 1899 Kent v Nottinghamshire
- Last FC: 1 September 1926 Middlesex v Warwickshire

Career statistics
Competition	First-class
Matches	378
Runs scored	6,663
Batting average	14.29
100s/50s	0/24
Top score	96*
Balls bowled	213
Wickets	0
Bowling average	–
5 wickets in innings	–
10 wickets in match	–
Best bowling	–
Catches/stumpings	565/269
- Source: CricInfo, 19 December 2018

Harry Robert Murrell (19 November 1879 – 15 August 1952), known as Joe Murrell, was an English cricketer who played over 350 matches, mainly for Middlesex County Cricket Club as a wicket-keeper.

Murrell was born at Hounslow in Middlesex. He made his first-class cricket debut for Kent County Cricket Club in 1899 and played for the county until the end of the 1905 season. Kent's wicket-keeper at the time was Fred Huish and Murrell found it difficult to gain a place, only keeping wicket in six of his 27 first-class matches for the county. In 1906 he joined Middlesex and was associated with the club for the next 46 years.

Murrell played 342 times for Middlesex in first-class cricket and developed a reputation as "a first-class wicket-keeper" who, when Middlesex won the County Championship in 1920 and 1921, was considered by Wisden as "one of the best of wicket-keepers". He was considered a loyal team-mate whose judgment and advice could be relied upon by Middlesex captain Pelham Warner and in his obituary Wisden considered him unfortunate to have not played for England. As a batsman Murrell was considered "fast-footed" and "could hit extremely hard", although he never scored a century.

Over the course of his career, Murrell took 835 dismissals, 564 caught and 271 stumped. After retiring, he was the 1st XI scorer for Middlesex until his death at West Wickham in Kent in 1952 at the age of 72.

He also played football for Woolwich Arsenal. After playing for local clubs in Kent and Middlesex, he joined Arsenal in October 1898, making his first-team debut against Small Heath on 31 March 1900. He played mainly as a full back filling in for regulars Jimmy Jackson and David McNichol. He left Arsenal for Clapton Orient in the summer of 1900, having played 6 first-team games for them.

== Bibliography ==
- Carlaw, Derek (2020). Kent County Cricketers, A to Z: Part One (1806–1914) (PDF). Cardiff: ACS.
