= David Collier (sports administrator) =

English sports administrator and businessman (1955–2026)

David Gordon Collier (22 April 1955 – 13 January 2026) was an English sports administrator and businessman.

Collier became the second chief executive of the England and Wales Cricket Board (ECB) when he was appointed in October 2004, succeeding Tim Lamb. He had a business background having spent ten years working in the travel and leisure industry, including posts such as a marketing manager within a small section of Sema Group plc, an Anglo French computer systems company (1986–1988), senior vice-president of American Airlines (1988–1992) and managing director of Servisair plc (1992–1993).

== Education ==
Collier was educated at Loughborough Grammar School, a day and boaŕding independent school for boys in Loughborough, Leicestershire, followed by Loughborough University, where he read Sports Science and Recreational Management.

== Career ==
Collier gained considerable cricket administration experience with four counties – as assistant secretary of Essex (1980–1983) and as chief executive of Gloucestershire (1983–1986), Leicestershire (1993–1999) and Nottinghamshire (1999–2004), before his ECB appointment.

He was roundly criticized in some sections of the British media for his role in the sale of television rights to Rupert Murdoch's Sky TV. Proponents of the move, including Collier himself, have pointed out that cricket desperately needs the investment which only comes from such rights sales. He also insisted that he wanted to see a "thriving television market", hitting back at claims that Sky's audience for live cricket averaged 200,000 viewers, compared with Channel 4's peak audience of nine million.

Collier was an international hockey umpire beginning in 1985, and in 2002 played an important part in organising a rescue package which bailed out England Hockey.

He was appointed Officer of the Order of the British Empire (OBE) in the 2015 New Year Honours for services to cricket.

In March 2015, Collier was appointed CEO of the Rugby League International Federation.

Collier was also Chairman of HIX Management Group, a Sports Management Company co-founded by him and the former professional golfer Andrew Hicks.

== Personal life and death ==
Collier died on 13 January 2026, at the age of 70.

Sporting positions
| Preceded by Tim Lamb | England and Wales Cricket Board Chief Executive; 2004–2015 | Succeeded by Tom Harrison |
