= List of Middlesex County Cricket Club Twenty20 cricketers =

This is a list of the 119 cricketers who have represented Middlesex County Cricket Club in Twenty20 cricket since 2003.

Those players who have only represented the club in Twenty20 cricket have been highlighted in bold text.

Players are listed in alphabetical order.

As of 4 September 2024

== A ==
- **Kyle Abbott** (2015) : K. J. Abbott
- Abdul Razzaq (2003) : Abdul Razzaq
- **Ashton Agar** (2018) : A. C. Agar
- David Alleyne (2003) : D. Alleyne
- Martin Andersson (2018-2024) : M. K. Andersson

== B ==
- George Bailey (2016) : G. J. Bailey
- Andrew Balbirnie (2014–2015) : A. Balbirnie
- Ethan Bamber (2021-2023) : E. R. Bamber
- Tom Barber (2017–2019) : T. E. Barber
- **Jason Behrendorff** (2022) : J. P. Behrendorff
- Gareth Berg (2009–2013) : G. K. Berg
- Melvyn Betts (2004–2005) : M. M. Betts
- Timothy Bloomfield (2003–2004) : T. F. Bloomfield
- **Dwayne Bravo** (2018) : D. J. Bravo
- Henry Brookes (2024) : H. J. H. Brookes
- Joe Burns (2015) : J. A. Burns
- David Burton (2008–2009) : D. A. Burton

== C ==
- **Neil Carter** (2008/09) : N. M. Carter
- Hilton Cartwright (2018) : H. W. R. Cartwright
- **Dan Christian** (2014) : D. T. Christian
- Pedro Collins (2010) : P. T. Collins
- Nick Compton (2004–2015) : N. R. D. Compton
- Simon Cook (2003–2004) : S. J. Cook
- Noah Cornwell (2024) : N. B. Cornwell
- Joe Cracknell (2020-2024) : J. B. Cracknell
- Steven Crook (2011–2012) : S. P. Crook
- Blake Cullen (2021-2024) : B. C. Cullen
- Miguel Cummins (2020) : M. L. Cummins

== D ==
- Jamie Dalrymple (2004–2011) : J. W. M. Dalrymple
- Josh Davey (2010–2013) : J. H. Davey
- Jack Davies (2020-2024) : J. L. B. Davies
- Joe Dawes (2003) : J. H. Dawes
- Joe Denly (2012–2014) : J. L. Denly
- Josh de Caires (2021-2024) : J. M. de Caires
- **AB de Villiers** (2019) : A. B. de Villiers
- Neil Dexter (2008/09–2015) : N. J. Dexter
- Leus du Plooy (2024) : J. L. du Plooy

== E ==
- Stephen Eskinazi (2016–2024) : S. S. Eskinazi
- Danny Evans (2009) : D. Evans

== F ==
- Nathan Fernandes (2023) : N. S. Fernandes
- Steven Finn (2008–2021) : S. T. Finn
- James Franklin (2015–2018) : J. E. C. Franklin
- James Fuller (2016–2018) : J. K. Fuller

== G ==
- Adam Gilchrist (2010) : A. C. Gilchrist
- Billy Godleman (2006–2009) : B. A. Godleman
- Toby Greatwood (2022-2023) : T. L. Greatwood
- **Chris Green** (2021-2022) : C. J. Green
- Nick Gubbins (2015–2021) : N. R. T. Gubbins

== H ==
- James Harris (2014–2020) : J. A. R. Harris
- Max Harris (2022-2023) : M. B. Harris
- Nantie Hayward (2004) : M. Hayward
- Tom Helm (2016–2024) : T. G. Helm
- Tyron Henderson (2007-2010) : T. Henderson
- Ryan Higgins (2014-2024) : R. F. Higgins
- Max Holden (2018–2024) : M. D. E. Holden
- Luke Hollman (2020-2024) : L. B. K. Hollman
- Dan Housego (2008–2009) : D. M. Housego
- Paul Hutchison (2005) : P. M. Hutchison
- Ben Hutton (2003–2007) : B. L. Hutton

== I ==
- Anthony Ireland (2011) : A. J. Ireland

== J ==
- Ed Joyce (2003–2008/09) : E. C. Joyce

== K ==
- Murali Kartik (2007–2009) : M. Kartik
- Chad Keegan (2003–2007) : C. B. Keegan
- Lance Klusener (2004) : L. Klusener

== L ==
- **Dan Lincoln** (2019-2020) : D. J. Lincoln
- Johann Louw (2006) : J. Louw

== M ==
- Dawid Malan (2006–2019) : D. J. Malan
- Pieter Malan (2023) : P. J. Malan
- **Mitchell McClenaghan** (2015-2016) : M. J. McClenaghan
- Brendon McCullum (2016) : B. B. McCullum
- **Ryan McLaren** (2011) : R. McLaren
- **Kyle Mills** (2013) : K. D. Mills
- Daryl Mitchell (2021) : D. J. Mitchell
- Mohammad Ali (2005–2006) : Mohammad Ali
- **Mohammad Hafeez** (2019) : Mohammad Hafeez
- Eoin Morgan (2006–2022) : E. J. G. Morgan
- **Mujeeb Ur Rahman** (2019-2021) : Mujeeb Ur Rahman
- Tim Murtagh (2007–2021) : T. J. Murtagh

== N ==
- Dirk Nannes (2008) : D. P. Nannes
- Scott Newman (2010–2011) : S. A. Newman
- Ashley Noffke (2002–2003) : A. A. Noffke

== O ==
- Iain O'Brien (2010) : I. E. O'Brien

== P ==
- Ravi Patel (2013–2018) : R. H. Patel
- Irfan Pathan (2005) : I. K. Pathan
- Chris Peploe (2005–2006) : C. T. Peploe
- Harry Podmore (2014-2017) : H. W. Podmore

== R ==
- Ollie Rayner (2012–2016) : O. P. Rayner
- Alan Richardson (2005–2009) : A. Richardson
- Sam Robson (2011-2021) : S. D. Robson
- Chris Rogers (2011–2012) : C. J. L. Rogers
- Toby Roland-Jones (2011–2023) : T. S. Roland-Jones
- Adam Rossington (2011–2014) : A. M. Rossington

== S ==
- Gurjit Sandhu (2013–2014) : G. S. Sandhu
- Tom Scollay (2011-2012) : T. E. Scollay
- Ben Scott (2004–2010) : B. J. M. Scott
- George Scott (2015–2019) : G. F. B. Scott
- Owais Shah (2003–2010) : O. A. Shah
- Chris Silverwood (2006–2009) : C. E. W. Silverwood
- John Simpson (2009–2023) : J. A. Simpson
- Ed Smith (2005–2008) : E. T. Smith
- Tom Smith (2010–2012) : T. M. J. Smith
- **Tim Southee** (2017) : T. G. Southee
- Nathan Sowter (2015–2021) : N. A. Sowter
- Paul Stirling (2010–2021) : P. R. Stirling
- Mark Stoneman (2024) : M. D. Stoneman
- Andrew Strauss (2003–2008/09) : A. J. Strauss
- Scott Styris (2005–2006) : S. B. Styris

== T ==
- Jackson Thompson (2010) : J. G. Thompson

== U ==
- Shaun Udal (2008–2010) : S. D. Udal

== V ==
- Daan van Bunge (2004) : D. L. S. van Bunge
- Adam Voges (2013–2017) : A. C. Voges

== W ==
- Thilan Walallawita (2020-2023) : T. N. Walallawita
- David Warner (2010) : D. A. Warner
- Paul Weekes (2003–2006) : P. N. Weekes
- Robin Weston (2003) : R. M. S. Weston
- Robbie White (2018) : R. G. White
- Oliver Wilkin (2012) : O. Wilkin
- Robbie Williams (2010) : R. E. M. Williams
- Chris Wright (2004–2005) : C. J. C. Wright
