= Clive Radley =

English cricketer

Personal information
- Full name: Clive Thornton Radley
- Born: 13 May 1944 (age 82); Hertford, England
- Height: 5 ft 10 in (1.78 m)
- Batting: Right-handed
- Bowling: Leg-break

International information
- National side: England
- Test debut (cap 478): 24 February 1978 v New Zealand
- Last Test: 24 August 1978 v New Zealand
- ODI debut (cap 47): 24 May 1978 v Pakistan
- Last ODI: 17 July 1978 v New Zealand

Domestic team information
- Years: Team
- 1961: Norfolk
- 1962–1990: Middlesex
- 1984/85: Auckland

Career statistics
Competition	Test	ODI	FC	LA
Matches	8	4	559	409
Runs scored	481	250	26,441	10,476
Batting average	48.10	83.33	35.44	30.54
100s/50s	2/2	1/1	46/139	7/57
Top score	158	117*	200	133*
Balls bowled	–	–	278	25
Wickets	–	–	8	1
Bowling average	–	–	20.00	18.00
5 wickets in innings	–	–	0	0
10 wickets in match	–	–	0	0
Best bowling	–	–	2/38	1/2
Catches/stumpings	4/–	0/–	516/–	138/–
- Source: CricketArchive, 9 April 2013

Clive Thornton Radley MBE (born 13 May 1944) is an English former cricketer, who played eight Test matches and four One Day Internationals for England. He was selected as one of the five Wisden Cricketers of the Year in 1979.

== County career ==
Radley represented Norfolk in 8 Minor County matches in 1961 and Middlesex in 62 2nd XI matches (1962–90) and 520 First-class matches for the 1st XI (1964–87), making 46 hundreds, with a best of 200. He also played for Auckland in New Zealand in 1984/85.

Radley was part of a successful Middlesex side which won the County Championship outright in 1976, 1980, 1982 and 1985, and also shared it with Kent in 1977. He also enjoyed success in one-day tournaments, especially in one-day finals played on his county home ground at Lord’s. He top-scored for his county in their victories in the final of the 1977 Gillette Cup, the 1983 Benson & Hedges Cup, the 1984 NatWest Trophy, and the 1986 Benson & Hedges Cup, winning the man of the match award in all of these except the latter. He was also part of the Middlesex side which won the 1980 Gillette Cup.

== Test career ==
Radley's batting average in Tests (48.10) was substantially higher than he achieved in all first-class cricket (35.44), despite his not making his Test debut until the comparatively advanced age of thirty-three. Also an acclaimed fieldsman, after years of scurrying accumulation for Middlesex, Mike Brearley's accession to the England captaincy did his international cause no harm. His brief Test career, however, was ended prematurely by a bad blow to the head in the first match on the 1978/79 tour of Australia. He made two test centuries, his highest score being an innings of 158 against New Zealand which lasted nearly 11 hours, made in Geoff Boycott’s last test as England captain.

== One-day international Career ==
Radley also ended his career with an unusually high average in one-day internationals of 83.33, assisted by the fact that he is one of the few international cricketers to make a century in his last One Day International, an unbeaten 117 against New Zealand in 1978. He was also named both man of the match, and man of the series, in this last appearance. All of his four internationals, like all of his test matches, were played in 1978.

== Post-retirement ==
On his retirement as a player, he served as the 2nd XI coach of Middlesex (1988–90) until his appointment as Marylebone Cricket Club (MCC) head coach in 1991 (in succession to Don Wilson) where he remained until his retirement in 2009. He was appointed Member of the Order of the British Empire (MBE) in the 2008 New Year Honours for services to cricket.

He was elected to serve for a two-year term as the 22nd President of Middlesex County Cricket Club at its 149th Annual General Meeting at Lord's in April 2013 succeeding Geoff Norris.
