= Nick Lamb (cricketer) =

English cricketer (born 1985)

Personal information
- Full name: Nicholas John Lamb
- Born: 9 November 1985 (age 41); St Albans, Hertfordshire, England
- Batting: Right-handed
- Bowling: Right-arm medium
- Relatives: Tim Lamb (father)

Domestic team information
- Years: Team
- 2003–2015: Hertfordshire
- 2005–2007: Durham UCCE

Career statistics
Competition	First-class
Matches	9
Runs scored	220
Batting average	14.66
100s/50s	–/1
Top score	62
Balls bowled	1,221
Wickets	17
Bowling average	41.64
5 wickets in innings	–
10 wickets in match	–
Best bowling	4/92
Catches/stumpings	2/–
- Source: Cricinfo, 20 August 2011

Nicholas John Lamb (born 9 November 1985) is an English former cricketer. Lamb is a right-handed batsman who bowls right-arm medium pace. He was born in St Albans, Hertfordshire.

Lamb made his debut in county cricket for Hertfordshire in the 2003 MCCA Knockout Trophy against Wales Minor Counties. Later, while studying for his degree at Durham University, Lamb made his first-class debut for Durham UCCE against Leicestershire in 2005. He made seven further first-class appearances for the university, the last of which came against Durham in 2007. In his eight first-class matches for the university, he scored 218 runs at an average of 16.76, with a high score of 62. This score, his only first-class fifty, came against Surrey in 2006. With the ball, he took 16 wickets at a bowling average of 41.31, with best figures of 4/92. While at Durham University, he also played a single first-class match for the British Universities against the touring Sri Lankans. With the ball, he took the wicket of Chamara Kapugedera, while with the bat he was dismissed for a duck in the British Universities first-innings by Malinga Bandara, while in their second-innings he was dismissed by Chaminda Vaas for 2 runs.

He played Minor counties cricket for Hertfordshire until 2015. His father, Tim Lamb, played first-class cricket for a number of teams.
