= 1993 County Championship =

English cricket tournament

- Dates: 29 April – 20 September 1993
- Administrator: England and Wales Cricket Board
- Cricket format: First-class cricket
- Tournament format: League system
- Champions: Middlesex (10th title)
- Participants: 18
- Matches: 153
- Most runs: Bill Athey, (Sussex); 1,432
- Most wickets: Mushtaq Ahmed, (Somerset); 85

The 1993 Britannic Assurance County Championship was the 94th officially organised running of the County Championship. Middlesex won the Championship title.

The season format was changed such that each county played only one match against each other county, resulting in 17 games played each. This was the first time in the history of the Championship that this had happened, although in 1892 there had been two matches against each county with the format of home and away matches. From 1993 onwards all matches were scheduled to take place over four days; this was a change from the format in place from 1988 to 1992 when a mixture of three- and four-day matches were played.

The Championship was sponsored by Britannic Assurance for the tenth time.

== Table ==
- 16 points for a win
- 8 points to each team for a tie
- 8 points to team still batting in a match in which scores finish level
- Bonus points awarded in first 120 overs of first innings
  - Batting: 200 runs - 1 point, 250 runs - 2 points 300 runs - 3 points, 350 runs - 4 points
  - Bowling: 3-4 wickets - 1 point, 5-6 wickets - 2 points 7-8 wickets - 3 points, 9-10 wickets - 4 points
- No bonus points awarded in a match starting with less than 8 hours' play remaining. A one-innings match is played, with the winner gaining 12 points.
- Position determined by points gained. If equal, then decided on most wins.

	Team	P	W	L	D	Bat	Bowl	Pts
1	Middlesex	17	11	1	5	37	59	272
2	Worcestershire	17	9	4	3	32	52	236
3	Glamorgan	17	9	5	3	32	55	231
4	Northamptonshire	17	8	4	5	35	59	222
5	Somerset	17	8	7	2	26	59	213
6	Surrey	17	6	6	5	40	60	196
7	Nottinghamshire	17	6	3	7	34	56	194
8	Kent	17	6	4	7	40	54	190
9	Leicestershire	17	6	5	6	23	61	180
10	Sussex	17	5	7	5	42	54	176
11	Essex	17	4	6	7	44	55	163
12	Yorkshire	17	5	4	8	21	56	157
13	Hampshire	17	4	5	8	39	47	150
14	Lancashire	17	4	8	5	38	48	150
15	Derbyshire	17	4	7	6	33	50	147
16	Warwickshire	17	4	8	5	24	49	137
17	Gloucestershire	17	3	10	4	24	56	128
18	Durham	17	2	10	5	29	52	113
