= Mike Murray (cricketer) =

English cricketer, banker, and administrator

Michael Patrick Murray (14 May 1930 – 28 March 2024) was an English banker, cricketer and administrator.

Murray was born in Westminster and represented Middlesex as a right-handed batsman in 1952 and 1953. He also captained Beddington Cricket Club and the Middlesex 2nd XI. In all, he played 10 first-class matches for Combined Services, Middlesex and Marylebone Cricket Club between 1949 and 1963.

Murray led a successful banking career with Lloyd's Bank. He joined the Middlesex County Cricket Club Cricket Committee in 1958 and the General Committee in 1960. He served as Treasurer (1975–1984), Chairman (1984–1993) and President (1997–1998). He also chaired the Test and County Cricket Board Finance Committee and published "The Murray Report" in 1992, which recommended the introduction of four-day County Championship matches.

He died on 28 March 2024, aged 93.
