= Alan Wright (cricket administrator) =

Alan J Wright (1938–2013) was an English cricket administrator for the Middlesex County Cricket Club.

Sporting positions
Preceded by Alan Burridge	Middlesex CCC Secretary; 1982–1983	Succeeded by Tim Lamb
