= Colin Drybrough =

Australian-born former cricketer

Personal information
- Full name: Colin David Drybrough
- Born: 31 August 1938 (age 88); East Melbourne, Victoria, Australia
- Batting: Right-handed
- Bowling: Slow left-arm orthodox

Domestic team information
- Years: Team
- 1958–1964: Middlesex
- 1960–1962: Oxford University

Career statistics
| Competition | First-class | List A |
|---|---|---|
| Matches | 133 | 3 |
| Runs scored | 1848 | 21 |
| Batting average | 15.40 | 7.00 |
| 100s/50s | 0/4 | –/– |
| Top score | 88 | 11 |
| Balls bowled | 22,254 | 30 |
| Wickets | 319 | 1 |
| Bowling average | 29.05 | 22.00 |
| 5 wickets in innings | 10 | – |
| 10 wickets in match | 1 | – |
| Best bowling | 7/35 | 1/22 |
| Catches/stumpings | 98/– | –/– |
- Source: Cricinfo, 26 October 2013

Colin David Drybrough (born 31 August 1938) is an Australian-born former cricketer who played all of his first-class cricket in England.

Born in East Melbourne in Victoria, Australia, Drybrough attended Highgate School in North London from 1950 to 1957 and scored 128 not out at Lord's for the Southern Schools against The Rest and captained the Public Schools against the Combined Services. In 1957 he was awarded the Cricket Society Prize for the most promising young cricketer of the year. Drybrough played for Middlesex Second XI in 1957, scoring 101 not out against Kent Second XI and 67 and 88 not out against Suffolk. He first appeared in first-class cricket for Middlesex in 1958 in matches against Oxford University and Cambridge University.

Drybrough was a student at Worcester College, Oxford, and from 1960 to 1962 he played for Oxford University, concentrating on bowling slow left-arm spinners to balance the Oxford attack. In 1961 and 1962 he was the Oxford captain, achieving draws each season against Cambridge sides that looked much stronger in batting than Oxford. He achieved his highest first-class score against the 1961 Australians with 88, and followed that up in the very next match with 7 for 35 in Leicestershire's second innings to give Oxford victory by 35 runs.

In university vacations he played for Middlesex. He was awarded his county cap in 1962 and then succeeded Ian Bedford as the county captain in 1963 when Middlesex came from 13th position in the County Championship in 1962 to 6th in 1963. He retired from first-class cricket in 1964 after two seasons in charge in which Middlesex finished sixth each time. In all he played in 92 first-class matches for Middlesex between 1958 and 1964 as a right-handed batsman and an orthodox slow left-arm bowler, taking 206 wickets at 27.77, with a personal best of 7 for 94, including a hat-trick, against Northamptonshire in 1964.

He also played for Melville CC in Western Australia.

Sporting positions
| Preceded by Ian Bedford | Middlesex County Cricket Captain; 1963–1964 | Succeeded by Fred Titmus |
