= Basil Robinson (cricketer) =

Canadian cricketer

Personal information
- Full name: Henry Basil Oswin Robinson
- Born: 3 March 1919; Eastbourne, Sussex, England
- Died: 21 December 2012 (aged 93); Ottawa, Ontario, Canada
- Batting: Right-handed
- Bowling: Right-arm off break

Domestic team information
- Years: Team
- 1951 & 1954: Canada
- 1947–1948: Oxford University

Career statistics
Competition	First-class
Matches	24
Runs scored	325
Batting average	13.54
100s/50s	–/1
Top score	51
Balls bowled	2,573
Wickets	53
Bowling average	27.20
5 wickets in innings	3
10 wickets in match	–
Best bowling	6/55
Catches/stumpings	16/–
- Source: CricketArchive, 14 October 2011

Henry Basil Oswin Robinson (3 March 1919 in Eastbourne, Sussex, England – 21 December 2012) was a Canadian cricketer and public servant. He was a right-handed batsman and an off-break bowler. He played 19 first-class matches for Oxford University in 1947 and 1948. Later, he played five first-class matches for Canada in the 1950s. He took 53 first-class wickets in his career at an average of 27.20, with best bowling figures of 6/55 playing for Oxford University against Worcestershire.

Robinson also excelled at soccer, winning the 1938 Challenge Trophy with Vancouver North Shore at the Dominion championship in Winnipeg. He played cricket, soccer and rugby at the University of British Columbia.
