= George Newman (cricketer) =

English sportsman

George Christopher Newman (26 April 1904 – 13 October 1982) was an English cricketer and all-round sportsman.

Newman was born in Paddington. He was educated at Eton and Christ Church, Oxford. He was awarded Blues at university in cricket and squash.

He represented Marylebone Cricket Club (MCC), Middlesex and Oxford University, as a right-handed middle order batsman and as a right-arm medium pace bowler in 73 first-class matches between 1926 and 1936. He scored 2,742 runs at an average of 25.86, with three centuries and took 27 catches. He toured Canada with Marylebone Cricket Club (MCC).

A noted athlete, he represented Oxford in the high jump, the relay race, hurdles and squash. He was President of Middlesex County Cricket Club (1963–1976) and the first President of the Seaxe Club (1968–1978). He died in Braintree, Essex, aged 78.
