= Tim Lamb =

English sports administrator and cricketer

The Honourable Tim Lamb
Personal information
- Full name: Timothy Michael Lamb
- Born: 24 March 1953 (age 73); Hartford, Cheshire, England
- Nickname: Tiger
- Height: 6 ft (183 cm)
- Batting: Right-handed
- Bowling: Right arm medium
- Role: Bowler
- Relatives: Nick Lamb (son)

Domestic team information
- Years: Team
- 1973–1974: Oxford University
- 1974–1977: Middlesex
- 1978–1983: Northamptonshire

Career statistics
Competition	FC	LA
Matches	160	166
Runs scored	1,274	432
Batting average	12.49	10.53
100s/50s	0/1	0/0
Top score	77	27
Balls bowled	23,208	7587
Wickets	361	190
Bowling average	28.97	25.70
5 wickets in innings	10	3
10 wickets in match	0	0
Best bowling	7/56	5/13
Catches/stumpings	40/0	34/0
- Source: CricketArchive (subscription required), 28 April 2021

Timothy Michael Lamb (born 24 March 1953) is an English sports administrator and former cricketer who played for a decade in County cricket for Middlesex and Northamptonshire as a bowler. After retiring from playing, he became an administrator, serving the Middlesex County Cricket Club, the Test and County Cricket Board (TCCB) and the England and Wales Cricket Board (ECB). His most notable cricket administrative roles were as chief executive of the TCCB and its successor ECB from 1996 to 2004. He later became the chief executive of the Sport and Recreation Alliance (formerly the CCPR) from 2005 until 2014. He left the Sport and Recreation Alliance and set up TML Sports Connections, a sports consultancy. He is also a member of the Cabinet Office Sport Honours Committee and a Trustee of the Hornsby Professional Cricketers' Fund.

== Early life and education ==
Lamb was born in Hartford, Cheshire in 1953, the second son of Foster Lamb, later to be the second Baron Rochester. His older brother, David Lamb, became the third Baron Rochester in 2017.

Lamb was educated at Shrewsbury School, a boarding and day independent school for boys (now coeducational), in the market town of Shrewsbury in Shropshire, followed by The Queen's College at the University of Oxford (at which he got blues in 1973 and 1974).

== Cricket career ==
Lamb played professional cricket for Middlesex (1974–1977) and Northamptonshire (1978–1983). A right-arm fast-medium bowler, he played 160 First Class matches between 1973 and 1983, taking 361 wickets (average 28.97) and scoring 1274 runs (average 12.49), with a top score of 77 against Nottinghamshire at Lord's. But he was perhaps better known for his record in the limited overs form of the game, where in all competitions he took a total of 190 wickets at an average of 25.70 at a highly respectable economy rate of 3.86. He also played in four Lord's Cup Finals.

== Sports administration ==
He entered sports administration as secretary and general manager of Middlesex County Cricket Club in 1984, and became cricket secretary of the Test and County Cricket Board in 1988 and chief executive (prior to the establishment of the ECB) in 1996. Under his leadership the sport of cricket witnessed a period of unprecedented reform and modernisation, which saw the introduction of Twenty20 Cricket, a two-division County Championship with promotion and relegation, central contracts for England players, the establishment of a National Academy and a resurgence of interest and participation in cricket among children (boys and girls), as well as a significant growth in the women's game. The ECB's annual commercial income more than doubled during his period of office. He was subsequently elected an Honorary Life Member of the Marylebone Cricket Club (MCC), Middlesex County Cricket Club and also Durham County Cricket Club in recognition of his services to cricket.

Lamb left the ECB in 2004 and the following year became chief executive of the CCPR (renamed the Sport and Recreation Alliance in December 2010), the independent umbrella body and trade association for the national governing and representative bodies of sport and recreation in the UK. Lamb retired from this position in February 2014.

== Personal life ==
He is married to Denise and has two children. His son Nick, played nine First-class matches for the Durham University Centre of Cricketing Excellence and the British Universities cricket team.

Sporting positions
Preceded by Alan Wright	Middlesex County Cricket Club Secretary/General Manager; 1984–1988	Succeeded by Peter Packham
Preceded by Alan Smith	England and Wales Cricket Board Chief Executive; 1996–2004	Succeeded by David Collier
Preceded by Margaret Talbot	Sport and Recreation Alliance (formerly CCPR) Chief Executive; 2005–2014	Succeeded by Emma Boggis
