= Mushtaq Ahmad =

Mushtaq Ahmad or Ahmed may refer to:

- Mushtaq Ahmad (Lord Lieutenant) (born 1942), Lord Lieutenant of Lanarkshire
- Mushtaq Ahmed (field hockey, born 1932) (1932–2011), field hockey striker from Pakistan
- Mushtaq Ahmad (field hockey, born 1956), field hockey forward from Pakistan
- Mushtaq Ahmed (cricketer) (born 1970), Pakistani Test cricketer
- Mushtaq Ahmed (lynching victim) (1980–2022), Pakistani murder victim
- Mushtaq Ahmed (politician) (1919–1996), interim President of Bangladesh, 1975
- Mushtaq Ahmed (writer) (1967–2021), Bangladeshi dissident writer, and entrepreneur
