= Charles Robins =

English cricketer and insurance executive (1935–2024)

Personal information
- Full name: Robert Victor Charles Robins
- Born: 13 March 1935; Burnham, Buckinghamshire, England
- Died: 13 January 2024 (aged 88); Kingston upon Thames, London England
- Batting: Right-handed
- Bowling: Right-arm leg-spin
- Relatives: Walter Robins (father)

Domestic team information
- Years: Team
- 1953 to 1960: Middlesex

Career statistics
Competition	First-class
Matches	60
Runs scored	1055
Batting average	12.71
100s/50s	0/0
Top score	49
Balls bowled	6460
Wickets	107
Bowling average	33.61
5 wickets in innings	3
10 wickets in match	0
Best bowling	7/78
Catches/stumpings	19/0
- Source: Cricinfo, 17 January 2017

Robert Victor Charles Robins (13 March 1935 – 13 January 2024) was an English cricket player, administrator, and insurance executive.

== Life and career ==
Charles Robins was born in Burnham, Buckinghamshire, the eldest son of Walter Robins, who played Test cricket for England in the 1930s.

Educated at Eton College, he was a successful schoolboy cricketer and captained the First XI in 1953. He played first-class cricket for Middlesex as a right-handed batsman and a leg-break-googly bowler between 1953 and 1960, and later captained the county Second XI.

Robins' best first-class bowling figures were 7 for 78 in Middlesex's victory over Cambridge University in 1954. In the County Championship, his best figures were 6 for 40 against Yorkshire in 1958.

Robins followed his father onto the Middlesex General Committee, giving many years of distinguished service. He was the County's Chairman of Cricket for 13 years, and succeeded Michael Sturt as the County Chairman (1994–1996). He was inducted into the Middlesex County Cricket Club Hall of Fame. He served as the President of the County Club for two years (2005–2007). He also led a successful insurance career with Stafford Knight for many years.

Robins died at Kingston Hospital in Kingston upon Thames on 13 January 2024, aged 88.
