= Frank Mann (cricketer) =

English cricketer (1888–1964)

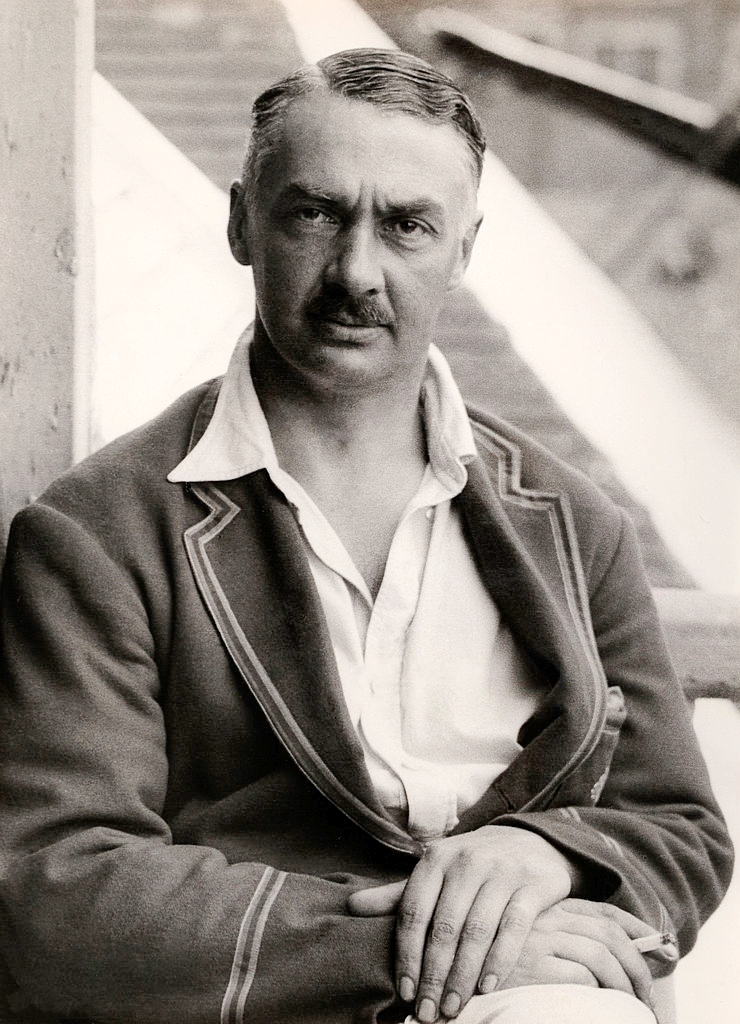
- Mann in about 1924

Personal information
- Full name: Francis Thomas Mann
- Born: 3 March 1888; Winchmore Hill, Middlesex, England
- Died: 6 October 1964 (aged 76); Milton Lilbourne, Wiltshire, England
- Batting: Right-handed
- Bowling: Right arm slow
- Relatives: George Mann (son); John Pelham Mann, (son)

International information
- National side: England
- Test debut (cap 209): 23 December 1922 v South Africa
- Last Test: 22 February 1923 v South Africa

Domestic team information
- Years: Team
- 1908–1911: Cambridge University
- 1909–1931: Middlesex

Career statistics
Competition	Test	First-class
Matches	5	398
Runs scored	281	13,235
Batting average	35.12	23.42
100s/50s	0/2	9/68
Top score	84	194
Balls bowled	0	236
Wickets	–	3
Bowling average	–	83.00
5 wickets in innings	–	0
10 wickets in match	–	0
Best bowling	–	1/7
Catches/stumpings	4/–	174/–
- Source: Cricinfo, 13 November 2008

Francis Thomas Mann (3 March 1888 – 6 October 1964) was an English cricketer. He played for the Malvern XI, Cambridge University, Middlesex and England. Mann captained England on the 1922–23 tour of South Africa, winning the five match series 2–1.

Mann was born in Winchmore Hill, Middlesex. During World War I he was an officer of the Scots Guards and was three times wounded and three times mentioned in dispatches. He died, aged 76, in Milton Lilbourne, Wiltshire.

His son, George Mann, also captained Middlesex County Cricket Club and England, making them the first father and son to have each captained Middlesex and, moreover, the first to have each captained England, at cricket. Simon Mann, the security expert and mercenary, was his grandson.

Sporting positions
Preceded by Lionel Tennyson	English national cricket captain 1922/3	Succeeded by Arthur Gilligan
Preceded by Pelham Warner	Middlesex County Cricket Captain; 1921–1928	Succeeded by Nigel Haig
