= Ian Bedford =

English cricketer

Personal information
- Full name: Philip Ian Bedford
- Born: 11 February 1930; Friern Barnet, Middlesex, England
- Died: 18 September 1966 (aged 36); On the way to Wanstead Hospital, Wanstead, Essex, England
- Batting: Right-handed
- Bowling: Right arm leg-spin

Domestic team information
- Years: Team
- 1947–1962: Middlesex

Career statistics
Competition	First-class
Matches	77
Runs scored	979
Batting average	16.31
100s/50s	0/3
Top score	75 not out
Balls bowled	7797
Wickets	128
Bowling average	32.87
5 wickets in innings	5
10 wickets in match	0
Best bowling	6/52
Catches/stumpings	45/0
- Source: Cricinfo, 30 January 2016

Philip Ian Bedford (11 February 1930 – 18 September 1966) was an English first-class cricketer who had a sensational start to his first-class career with Middlesex in 1947 as a 17-year-old lower-order batsman and leg break bowler. In his first match, against Essex, he was the fourth spin bowler used in the Essex first innings, but took four wickets for 81 runs. He then took four for 65 in his second match against Nottinghamshire, five for 53 in his third against Surrey and five for 54 in his fourth and final match of 1947 against Lancashire.

He was less successful in subsequent seasons, and returned to club cricket in 1951 while working for a construction company, until he succeeded John Warr as Middlesex captain in 1961 and 1962. He was a popular captain, who often declared boldly in an effort to achieve a result.

Bedford played in 77 first-class matches between 1947 and 1962, taking 128 wickets at an average cost of 32.87, with a personal best of 6/52.

He died following a brain aneurysm, while batting for Finchley C.C. at Buckhurst Hill in 1966. He was 36. He left a wife and four young daughters.

Sporting positions
Preceded by John Warr	Middlesex County Cricket Captain; 1961–1962	Succeeded by Colin Drybrough
