= Nigel Haig =

English cricketer

Personal information
- Full name: Nigel Esme Haig
- Born: 12 December 1887; Kensington, London, England
- Died: 27 October 1966 (aged 78); Eastbourne, Sussex, England
- Batting: Right-handed
- Bowling: Right-arm fast-medium

International information
- National side: England
- Test debut: 11 June 1921 v Australia
- Last Test: 3 April 1930 v West Indies

Career statistics
Competition	Test	First-class
Matches	5	513
Runs scored	126	15,220
Batting average	14.00	20.90
100s/50s	0/0	12/61
Top score	47	131
Balls bowled	1,026	78,172
Wickets	13	1,117
Bowling average	34.46	27.48
5 wickets in innings	0	47
10 wickets in match	0	2
Best bowling	3/73	7/33
Catches/stumpings	4/–	220/–
- Source: CricInfo, 6 November 2022

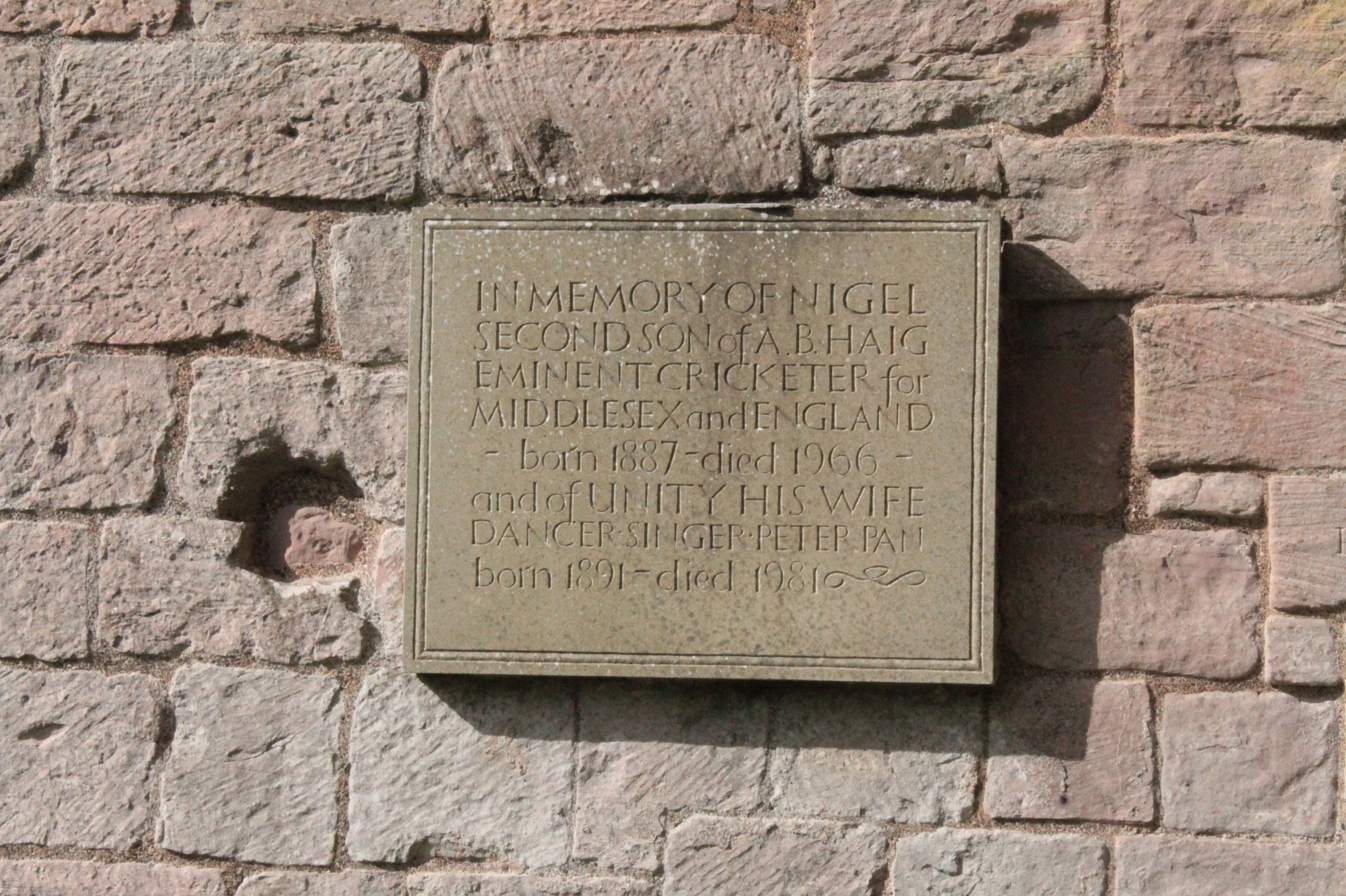
The grave of Nigel Haig, Dryburgh Abbey

Nigel Esme Haig MC (12 December 1887 – 27 October 1966) was a first-class cricketer who played for Middlesex and England.

He was the son of Arthur Balfour Haig.

Tall, stringy and deceptively frail in appearance, Haig played regularly from 1912 to 1934 as an amateur batsman who could open the innings or bat further down the order and as a tireless swing bowler somewhat above medium pace. His all-round usefulness is shown by the fact that he made 1,000 runs in a season six times and took 100 wickets five times. He did the all-rounder's double of 1,000 runs and 100 wickets in a season three times, in 1921, 1927 and 1929. He was captain of Middlesex for six seasons from 1929, sharing the job in the last two years with H. J. Enthoven.

Haig's Test match career was undistinguished. He was brought into the England team, like so many others, for just one match and then discarded in the 1921 series against the all-conquering Australians under Warwick Armstrong. Eight years later, in 1929–30, he was a member of Freddie Calthorpe's team that played the first four Tests in the West Indies.

Haig was a nephew of Lord Harris and an all-round sportsman, good at ice hockey, real tennis, lawn tennis, rackets, soccer, rugby union and golf. During the First World War, while serving with the Royal Field Artillery, Haig was awarded the Military Cross in the 1917 Birthday Honours.

Ian Peebles, who played under Haig at Middlesex, said of him: "He had a witty and active mind, with interests ranging from bird watching to music and poetry. He was a wonderful companion and guide to us youngsters, and he had a hot Scots temper which kept us, very properly, in some awe of him."

In 1918 Haig married the actress Unity More.

He is buried close to his grandfather Earl Haig in Dryburgh Abbey.

Sporting positions
Preceded by Frank Mann	Middlesex County Cricket Captain; 1929–1934 (jointly with Tommy Enthoven 1933–4)	Succeeded by Walter Robins
