= Michael Sturt =

English cricketer and businessman

Personal information
- Full name: Michael Ormonde Cleasby Sturt
- Born: 12 December 1941 (age 84); Wembley, Middlesex, England
- Batting: Right-handed
- Role: Wicket-keeper

Domestic team information
- Years: Team
- 1961–1978: Middlesex

Career statistics
Competition	FC	List A
Matches	33	1
Runs scored	202	–
Batting average	7.76	–
100s/50s	0/0	–
Top score	26	–
Catches/stumpings	64/8	0/1
- Source: Cricinfo, 30 September 2022

Michael Ormonde Cleasby Sturt (born 12 September 1941) is an English businessman and cricketer.

Mike Sturt was born in Wembley, Middlesex. He played county cricket for Middlesex County Cricket Club in six separate seasons between 1961 and 1978, as a right-handed lower-order batsman and a highly efficient deputy wicketkeeper, for most of the period playing only when John Murray was not available through Test or other commitments. He was a member of Middlesex's championship-winning team of 1976 after Mike Brearley asked him to play when the county's other wicket-keepers became unavailable.

Sturt combined a successful business career in the City with his cricket. He was a longtime committee member for both Marylebone Cricket Club (MCC) and Middlesex. He has served as an MCC Trustee and as the County Chairman of Middlesex in 1993, before he suddenly resigned due to "a matter of principle".
