= Tom Enthoven =

English cricketer

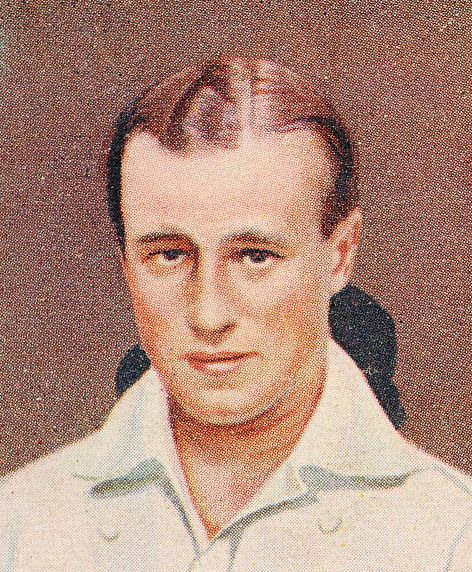

Personal information
- Full name: Henry John Enthoven
- Born: 4 June 1903; Cartagena, Murcia, Spain
- Died: 29 June 1975 (aged 72); Kensington, London, England
- Batting: Right-handed
- Bowling: Right-arm medium

Domestic team information
- Years: Team
- 1923–1926: Oxford University
- 1925–1936: Middlesex
- 1927–1948: Marylebone Cricket Club

Career statistics
Competition	First-class
Matches	194
Runs scored	7,362
Batting average	27.16
100s/50s	9/36
Top score	139
Balls bowled	16,991
Wickets	252
Bowling average	32.13
5 wickets in innings	5
10 wickets in match	1
Best bowling	6/64
Catches/stumpings	78/–
- Source: Cricinfo, 18 June 2022

Henry John Enthoven (4 June 1903 – 29 June 1975) was an English first-class cricketer who was born in Cartagena, Spain, and was educated at Harrow School and Pembroke College, Cambridge. He played in 123 first-class matches for Middlesex County Cricket Club, as a right-handed batsman and right-arm medium bowler between 1923 and 1936, scoring 4478 runs and taking 100 wickets. He shared the county captaincy with Nigel Haig in 1933 and 1934. He later served as the club treasurer.

He died in Kensington, London aged 72.

Preceded by Nigel Haig	Middlesex County Cricket Captain; 1933–1934 (jointly with Nigel Haig)	Succeeded by Walter Robins
