= Mann baronets =

Set index for Mann baronets

There have been two baronetcies created for persons with the surname Mann, one in the Baronetage of Great Britain and one in the Baronetage of the United Kingdom.

- Mann baronets of Linton Hall (1755)
- Mann baronets of Thelveton Hall (1905)
