= John Warr =

English cricketer (1927–2016)

Personal information
- Full name: John James Warr
- Born: 16 July 1927; Ealing, Middlesex, England
- Died: 9 May 2016 (aged 88)
- Batting: Right-handed
- Bowling: Right-arm fast-medium

International information
- National side: England
- Test debut: 5 January 1951 v Australia
- Last Test: 2 February 1951 v Australia

Career statistics
Competition	Test	First-class
Matches	2	344
Runs scored	4	3,838
Batting average	1.00	11.45
100s/50s	0/0	0/3
Top score	4	54*
Balls bowled	584	53,012
Wickets	1	956
Bowling average	281.00	22.79
5 wickets in innings	0	35
10 wickets in match	0	5
Best bowling	1/76	9/65
Catches/stumpings	0/–	118/–
- Source: Cricinfo, 8 August 2021

John James Warr (16 July 1927 – 9 May 2016) was an English cricketer. A successful county player for Middlesex County Cricket Club, he took part in two Test matches for England. Warr was known for his sense of humour and made many humorous after-dinner speeches.

== First-class career ==
Warr played for Middlesex as a right-arm fast-medium bowler, in 260 first-class matches between 1949 and 1960. He took 703 wickets for the county at an average of 20.75, with personal best figures of 9 for 65 against Kent in August 1956. Playing for both Middlesex and the University of Cambridge, he took 87 wickets in the 1950 season which ranked him 32nd on the list of wicket-takers in the first-class season.

While still studying at Cambridge, Warr was selected for the 1950–51 tour of Australia. He played in two of the five Test matches, with the worst debut bowling performance in Test cricket, taking no wickets but conceding 142 runs, a record which stood until 2009 when Australian Bryce McGain went wicketless while conceding 149 runs against South Africa. He went on to take just one wicket, that of Australia's number seven, Ian Johnson, caught behind. In those two matches, he conceded 281 runs, the worst bowling figures of any Test cricketer in history until the record was surpassed in 1985 by Sri Lanka's Roger Wijesuriya. As of 2016 his bowling average remains the worst of any retired England Test player; only Ravi Bopara has a worse average. According to the 1952 Wisden Cricketers' Almanack Warr "tried hard and cheerfully, but he could not be regarded as Test class."

John in fact in these two Tests took one for 281, which caused a few of us thereafter childishly to hum in his presence the Ancient and Modern Hymn number 281, 'Lead us Heavenly Father, lead us', with emphasis on the lines "Lone and Dreary, Faint and Weary, Through the Desert thou did'st go." In fact, of course, it was J.J. Warr's prime virtue that he never seemed either faint or weary, on the field or off. Laughter was seldom far away when he was about... – E. W. Swanton

Warr captained Middlesex between 1958 and 1960. He took 100 first-class wickets twice – in 1956 and 1959. Warr also played fifteen matches for the Gentlemen of England, three times for E. W. Swanton's XI in the West Indies in 1955–56, and three times for the Duke of Norfolk's XI in Jamaica in 1956–57.

== Personal life ==
Born in Ealing, Middlesex, England, Warr was the youngest of three children. He attended Ealing Grammar School for Boys before four years of national service in the Fleet Air Arm. Warr won Blues every year from 1949 to 1952 while he studied history at Emmanuel College, Cambridge, and was captain of the Cambridge University Cricket Club in 1951. He married Valerie Powell in 1957; they had two daughters. After retirement, he wrote for The Sunday Telegraph and worked as a discount broker. He later became a member of the Jockey Club in 1977 and was chairman between 1989 and 1993.

Warr became a popular after-dinner speaker, and in 1974 he was asked to become Australia's Board of Control's representative in England after one such appearance, a position he held until 1987. He was President of the Marylebone Cricket Club (MCC) in 1987–88, and was made honorary life vice-president in 1996. He became president of the Berkshire County Cricket Club in 1990.

Warr died on 9 May 2016, aged 88.

Sporting positions
Preceded by Bill Edrich	Middlesex County Cricket Captain; 1958–1960	Succeeded by Ian Bedford
