= Middlesex County Cricket Club =

Cricket club in London, England

- One Day name: Middlesex

Personnel
- Captain: TBA
- One Day captain: Ben Geddes
- Coach: Peter Fulton
- Chief executive: Andrew Cornish

Team information
- Colours: First-class: White shirts White trousers List A: Blue shirts Blue trousers T20: Pink & blue shirts Blue trousers
- Founded: 1864
- Home ground: Lord's
- Capacity: 31,100

History
- First-class debut: Sussex in 1864 at Cattle Market Ground, Islington
- Championship wins: 11 (plus 2 shared)
- Sunday League wins: 1
- Benson & Hedges Cup wins: 2
- One-Day Cup wins: 4
- Twenty20 Cup wins: 1
- Official website: Middlesex CCC; 17 June 2025
First-class
One-day
T20

Middlesex County Cricket Club is one of eighteen first-class county clubs within the domestic cricket structure of England and Wales. It represents the historic county of Middlesex which has effectively been subsumed within the ceremonial county of Greater London. The club was founded in 1864 but teams representing the county have played top-class cricket since the early 18th century and the club has always held first-class status. Middlesex have competed in the County Championship since the official start of the competition in 1890 and have played in every top-level domestic cricket competition in England.

The club plays most of its home games at Lord's Cricket Ground, which is owned by Marylebone Cricket Club, in St John's Wood. The club also plays some games at the Uxbridge Cricket Club Ground (historically Middlesex) and the Old Deer Park in Richmond (historically Surrey). Until October 2014, the club played limited overs cricket as the Middlesex Panthers, having changed from Middlesex Crusaders in 2009 following complaints from Muslims and Jews. On 24 October 2014, the club announced that they would use the name Middlesex County Cricket Club in all forms of the sport with immediate effect. Limited-overs kit colours are dark blue and pink quarters and from 2007, Middlesex have worn exclusive pink shirts during their Twenty20 matches in support of the Breakthrough Breast Cancer charity. The club has an indoor school based in Finchley, the Middlesex Academy and a project at Radlett Cricket Club.

Middlesex have won thirteen County Championship titles (including 2 shared titles), the most recent in 2016. In limited overs cricket, they have won two Benson & Hedges Cups, four one-day cricket titles, one National League and the Twenty20 Cup, through which they became the first county club to qualify for both the Stanford Super Series and the Twenty20 Champions League.

== Honours ==
=== First XI honours ===
- Champion County (1) – 1866
- County Championship (11) – 1903, 1920, 1921, 1947, 1976, 1980, 1982, 1985, 1990, 1993, 2016; shared (2) – 1949, 1977

Division Two (1): 2011

- FP Trophy (4) – 1977, 1980, 1984, 1988
- National League (1) – 1992

Division Two (1): 2004

- Twenty20 Cup (1) – 2008
- Benson & Hedges Cup (2) – 1983, 1986

=== Second XI honours ===
- Second XI Championship (5) – 1974, 1989, 1993, 1999, 2000; shared (1) – 2013
- Second XI Trophy (2) – 2007, 2018
- Second XI T20 (2) – 2015, 2016
- Minor Counties Championship (1) – 1935

== History ==
=== Earliest cricket ===
It is almost certain that cricket reached London, and thereby Middlesex, by the 16th century. Early references to the game in London or Middlesex are often interchangeable and sometimes it is not clear if a particular team represents the city or the county.

See: History of cricket to 1696 and History of cricket 1697 - 1725

The first definite mention of cricket in London or Middlesex dates from 1680. It is a clear reference to "the two umpires" (the earliest mention of an umpire in what seems to be a cricket connection) and strongly suggests that the double wicket form of the game was already well known in London.

The earliest known match in Middlesex took place at Lamb's Conduit Fields in Holborn on 3 July 1707 involving teams from London and Croydon. In 1718, the first reference is found to White Conduit Fields in Islington, which later became a very famous London venue.

The earliest known reference to a team called Middlesex is on 5 August 1728 when it played London Cricket Club "in the fields behind the Woolpack, in Islington, near Sadlers Wells, for £50 a side". This was also the earliest known match involving a Middlesex team.

For information about Middlesex county teams before the formation of Middlesex CCC, see: Middlesex county cricket team (pre-1864)

=== Origin of club ===
There are references to earlier county organisations, especially the MCC Thursday Club around 1800, but the definitive Middlesex club is the present Middlesex CCC. The club was informally founded on 15 December 1863 at a meeting in the London Tavern. Formal constitution took place on 2 February 1864. The creation of the club was largely through the efforts of the Walker family of Southgate, which included several notable players including the famous V. E. Walker, who in 1859 became the first player to take 10 wickets in an innings and score a century in the same match.

=== Early history ===
Middlesex CCC played its initial first-class match versus Sussex CCC at Islington on 6 & 7 June 1864. In the same season, the club was a contender for the title of "Champion County". Middlesex played at Lillie Bridge Grounds from 1869 before leaving in 1872 due to the poor quality of the turf. The club nearly folded at this time, a vote for continuing being won 7–6. They played at Prince's Cricket Ground from 1872 to 1876, and began using Lord's Cricket Ground in 1877.

=== 20th century ===
The club has produced several noted players, particularly the great batsmen Patsy Hendren, Bill Edrich and Denis Compton.

Bill Edrich scored 1,000 runs before the end of May in 1938. He needed just 15 innings, with 4 centuries, and every run was scored at Lord's. Don Bradman gave him the chance to score the 10 runs he needed in the Australian tour match with Middlesex by declaring his team's innings early.

Middlesex won the County Championship in 1947 thanks to the unprecedented run scoring of Compton and Edrich. They both passed Tom Hayward's 1906 record of 3,518 runs in a season with Compton making 3,816 at 90.86 and Edrich 3,539 at 80.43 with a dozen centuries. Compton's 18 centuries surpassed Jack Hobbs' former record of 16, set in 1925. Together with Jack Robertson's 2,214 runs and Syd Brown's 1,709 and the bowling of Jack Young, Jim Sims, Laurie Gray and Compton and Edrich themselves, the championship was won. The following season Compton and Edrich made their record unbeaten stand of 424 for the 3rd wicket against Somerset at Lords.

Middlesex's most successful period coincided with the captaincies of Mike Brearley and Mike Gatting from 1971 to 1997. Brearley proved as astute for his county as he did for his country between 1971 and 1982. His team included Gatting and England spin bowlers John Emburey and Phil Edmonds, and overseas fast bowlers such as Wayne Daniel.

=== Recent history ===
In 2007 Middlesex had mixed fortunes in Domestic Cricket. In the four-day version of the game, the club finished 3rd of the nine teams in Division 2 of the Liverpool Victoria County Championship, narrowly missing out on promotion. However, 3rd place in Division 2 of the NatWest Pro 40 League was enough to earn them a place in the play-off final against Northamptonshire Steelbacks. Middlesex won that game comfortably and therefore gained promotion to Division 1 for the 2008 Season. There was less success in the two knockout cups where Middlesex failed to progress beyond the group stages of either tournament. In the Friends Provident Trophy they finished 7th of the ten teams in the Southern Division. Likewise in the Twenty20 Cup, 5th place of the six teams in the Southern Division was not good enough to see them progress.

In 2008, Middlesex won the Twenty20 Cup by beating Kent in the final at The Rose Bowl. As well as being the club's first major trophy for 15 seasons, the final was also memorable for Middlesex's record breaking 187/6 (the highest ever Twenty20 Cup Finals Day score) with Kent's retort of 184/5 (being second on the all-time list) and ensured that the Cup was decided on the last ball of the match. The victory is also made historic as Middlesex became the first County Cricket Club to gain entry to both the Twenty20 Champions League and the Stanford Super Series.

However 2008 also saw Middlesex suffer relegation in the Pro40 Division One (finishing in last place). And in a copy of their final standings from the previous season, Middlesex both failed to make it past the group stage in the Friends Provident Trophy and finished in 3rd place in the County Championship Division Two, again missing out on promotion by just one position.

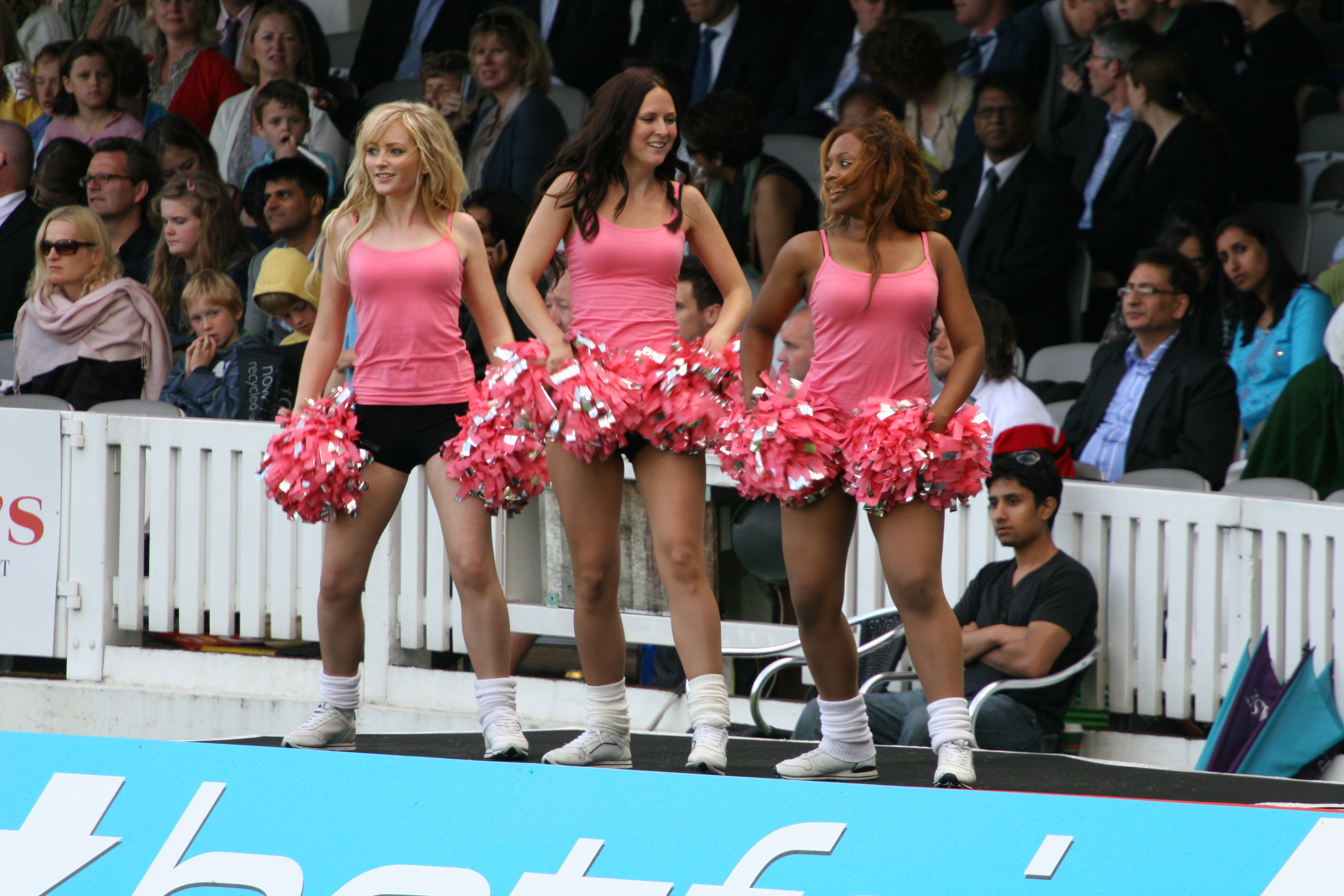
Middlesex cheerleaders at the British Asian Cup, 2009

It was announced in February 2009 that Middlesex changed their limited overs name from the Middlesex Crusaders, to the Middlesex Panthers, following complaints made by Muslim and Jewish communities. On 24 October 2014, the club announced that the limited overs name will revert to Middlesex County Cricket Club (Middlesex CCC), with immediate effect.

2011 saw a dramatic improvement in form for Middlesex, as they won the LV= County Championship Division Two for the first time in their history, sealing promotion to Division One for the 2012 season. They narrowly missed out on a place in the CB40 semi-finals, after coming joint top of their group with the Sussex Sharks, missing out only via net run-rate.

In 2016, Middlesex were unbeaten in the County Championship and secured the title on the final day of the season when they defeated one of their main challengers Yorkshire in the title decider at Lord's. A defeat for Middlesex in that match would have meant the title going to Yorkshire and a draw would have meant it going to Somerset.

The following season, 2017, Middlesex finished in the bottom two of the County Championship and were subsequently relegated down to the second Division. In 2022 they secured promotion back to the top flight of the County Championship on the penultimate day of the season by finishing runners up to Nottinghamshire in Division two.

== Sponsorship ==
Year	Kit manufacturer	Shirt sponsors		
Year	Kit manufacturer	First-Class	One-Day	T20
2003	Crusader Sport	Northern Rock		
2004	Crusader Sport	Northern Rock		
2005	Crusader Sport	Northern Rock		
2006	Crusader Sport	Northern Rock		
2007	Crusader Sport	Northern Rock		
2008	MKK Sports	Northern Rock		
2009	MKK Sports	Ignis		
2010	MKK Sports	Ignis		
2011	MKK Sports	Ignis		
2012	MKK Sports	Brooks Macdonald		
2013	MKK Sports	Brooks Macdonald		
2014	MKK Sports	Brooks Macdonald		
2015	MKK Sports	Brooks Macdonald		
2016	MKK Sports	Brooks Macdonald		
2017	Nike	Brooks Macdonald		
2018	Nike	Brooks Macdonald		
2019	Nike	Brooks Macdonald	JMAN Group	Kingspan
2020	Nike	Brooks Macdonald	Perfect Smile	Knight Frank
2021	Nike	Brooks Macdonald	Perfect Smile	Knight Frank
2022	Nike	Knight Frank		
2023	Nike	Knight Frank		
2024	Castore	Dafabet		
2025	Castore	Dafabet		
2026	Castore	IBC		

== Records ==
=== First-class ===
==== Team records ====
- Highest total for – 676–5 declared v. Sussex, Hove, 2021
- Highest total against – 850–7 declared by Somerset, Taunton, 2007
- Lowest total for – 20 v. MCC, Lord's, 1864
- Lowest total against – 31 by Gloucestershire, Bristol, 1924

==== Batting records ====
- Highest score – 331 J. D. B. Robertson v. Worcestershire, Worcester, 1949
- Highest score against – 341 C. M. Spearman for Gloucestershire, Gloucester, 2004
- Most runs in season – 2,669 E. H. Hendren, 1923

Most runs for Middlesex
Qualification – 20,000 runs

Batsman	Runs
Patsy Hendren	40,302 (1907–1937)
Mike Gatting	28,411 (1975–1998)
Jack Hearne	27,612 (1909–1936)
Jack Robertson	27,088 (1937–1959)
Bill Edrich	25,738 (1937–1959)
Clive Radley	24,147 (1964–1987)
Eric Russell	23,103 (1956–1972)
Denis Compton	21,781 (1936–1958)
Peter Parfitt	21,302 (1956–1972)

==== Bowling records ====
- Best bowling – 10–40 G. O. B. Allen v. Lancashire, Lord's, 1929
- Best bowling against – 9–38 R. C. Robertson-Glasgow for Somerset, Lord's, 1924
- Best match bowling
  - 16–114 G. Burton v. Yorkshire, Bramall Lane, Sheffield, 1888
  - 16–114 J. T. Hearne v. Lancashire, Old Trafford, Manchester, 1898
- Best match bowling against – 16–100 J. E. B. B. P. Q. C. Dwyer for Sussex, Hove, 1906
- Wickets in season – 158 F. J. Titmus, 1955

Most wickets for Middlesex
Qualification – 1,000 wickets

Bowler	Wickets
Fred Titmus	2,361 (1949–1982)
J. T. Hearne	2,093 (1888–1923)
J. W. Hearne	1,438 (1909–1936)
Jim Sims	1,257 (1929–1952)
John Emburey	1,250 (1973–1995)
Jack Young	1,182 (1933–1956)
Jack Durston	1,178 (1919–1933)
Alan Moss	1,088 (1950–1963)
Frank Tarrant	1,005 (1904–1914)

==== Wicket-keeping records ====
Most dismissals for Middlesex
Qualification – 500 dismissals

Wicketkeeper	Total dismissals			Period
Wicketkeeper	Total	Catches	Stumpings	Period
John Murray	1,223	1,023	200	1952–1975
Fred Price	940	629	311	1926–1947
Joe Murrell	765	502	263	1906–1926
John Simpson	658	621	37	2009–2023
Leslie Compton	566	437	129	1938–1956
Paul Downton	547	484	63	1980–1991

==== Best partnership for each wicket ====
Partnership	Runs	Players	Opposition	Venue	Season
1st wicket	376	Sam Robson & Mark Stoneman	v. Sussex	Hove	2021
2nd wicket	380	Frank Tarrant & Jack Hearne	v. Lancashire	Lord's	1914
3rd wicket	424*	Bill Edrich & Denis Compton	v. Somerset	Lord's	1948
4th wicket	325	Jack Hearne & Patsy Hendren	v. Hampshire	Lord's	1919
5th wicket	338	Robert Lucas & Tim O'Brien	v. Sussex	Hove	1895
6th wicket	270	John Carr & Paul Weekes	v. Gloucestershire	Lord's	1994
7th wicket	271*	Patsy Hendren & Frank Mann	v. Nottinghamshire	Nottingham	1925
8th wicket	182*	Mordaunt Doll & Joe Murrell	v. Nottinghamshire	Lord's	1913
9th wicket	172	Gareth Berg & Tim Murtagh	v. Leicestershire	Leicester	2011
10th wicket	230	Richard Nicholls & Mickey Roche	v. Kent	Lord's	1899
Source: Highest Partnership for Each Wicket for Middlesex CricketArchive.com; Last updated: 14 April 2024

* – Indicates that the partnership was unbroken

=== List A ===
==== Team records ====
- Highest total for – 390–5 (50 overs) v. Durham, Chester-le-Street, 2025
- Highest total against – 404–4 (50 overs) by Sussex, Hove, 2022
- Lowest total for – 23 (19.4 overs) v. Yorkshire, Leeds, 1974
- Lowest total against – 41 (32 overs) by Northamptonshire, Northampton, 1975

==== Batting records ====
- Highest score – 182, S.S. Eskinazi, Radlett, 2022
- Highest score against – 189* T. P. Alsop for Sussex, Hove, 2022

==== Bowling records ====
- Best bowling for – 7–12 W. W. Daniel v. Minor Counties East, Ipswich, 1978
- Best bowling against – 6–27 J. C. Tredwell for Kent, Southgate, 2009

==== Best partnership for each wicket ====
- 1st – 221* Paul Stirling & Dawid Malan v. Leicestershire, Leicester, 2013
- 2nd – 268 Dawid Malan & Nick Gubbins v. Sussex, Hove, 2015
- 3rd – 277 Nick Compton & Eoin Morgan v. Kent, Canterbury, 2009
- 4th – 220 Ed Joyce & Jamie Dalrymple v. Glamorgan, Lord's, 2004
- 5th – 184* Stephen Eskinazi & Nick Gubbins v. Gloucestershire, Lord's, 2019
- 6th – 197 James Harris & John Simpson v. Lancashire, Lord's, 2019
- 7th – 132 Keith Brown & Neil Williams v. Somerset, Lord's, 1988
- 8th – 80 Ben Hutton & Chad Keegan v. Durham, Chester-le-Street, 2003
- 9th – 84* Neil Dexter & Steven Finn v. Glamorgan, Cardiff, 2014
- 10th – 57* Eoin Morgan & Mohammad Ali v. Somerset, Bath, 2006

* Denotes not out/unbroken partnership

== Club captains ==
- Edward Walker 1864–1872
- Isaac Walker 1873–1884
- Alexander Webbe 1885–1897
- Alexander Webbe & Andrew Stoddart 1898
- Gregor MacGregor 1899–1907
- Plum Warner 1908–1920
- Frank Mann 1921–1928
- Nigel Haig 1929–1932
- Tom Enthoven & Nigel Haig 1933–1934
- Walter Robins
  1935–1938, 1946–1947, 1950
- Ian Peebles 1939
- George Mann 1948–1949
- Denis Compton & Bill Edrich 1951–1952
- Bill Edrich 1953–1957
- John Warr 1958–1960
- Ian Bedford 1961–1962
- Colin Drybrough 1963–1964
- Fred Titmus 1965–1968
- Peter Parfitt 1968–1970
- Mike Brearley 1971–1982
- Mike Gatting 1983–1997
- Mark Ramprakash 1997–1999
- Justin Langer 2000
- Angus Fraser 2001–2002
- Andrew Strauss 2002–2004
- Ben Hutton 2005–2006
- Ed Smith 2007–2008
- Shaun Udal 2009–2010
- Neil Dexter 2010–2013
- Chris Rogers 2014
- Adam Voges 2015–2016
- James Franklin 2017
- Dawid Malan 2018-2019
- Stephen Eskinazi 2020
- Peter Handscomb 2021
- Tim Murtagh 2022
- Toby Roland-Jones 2023-2025
- Leus du Plooy 2025 to date

== Current squad ==
- No. denotes the player's squad number, as worn on the back of their shirt.
- ‡ denotes players with international caps.
- * denotes a player who has been awarded a county cap.

No.	Name	Nationality	Birth date	Batting style	Bowling style	Notes
Batters
4	Max Holden*	England	18 December 1997 (age 28)	Left-handed	Right-arm off break	
9	Aaryan Sawant	England	15 November 2005 (age 20)	Right-handed	Right-arm off break	
12	Sam Robson* ‡	England	1 July 1989 (age 37)	Right-handed	Right-arm leg break	
14	Ben Geddes	England	31 July 2001 (age 25)	Right-handed	Right-arm medium	Captain (List A)
—	Ali Orr	England	6 April 2001 (age 25)	Left-handed	Right-arm medium	
All-rounders
18	Nathan Fernandes	England	26 April 2004 (age 22)	Left-handed	Slow left-arm orthodox	
23	Caleb Falconer	England	14 September 2006 (age 20)	Right-handed	Right-arm fast-medium	
25	Josh de Caires	England	25 April 2002 (age 24)	Right-handed	Right-arm off break	
29	Ryan Higgins*	England	6 January 1995 (age 31)	Right-handed	Right-arm fast-medium	
56	Luke Hollman	England	16 September 2000 (age 26)	Left-handed	Right-arm leg break	
73	Jack Nelson	England	21 May 2008 (age 18)	Right-handed	Right-arm leg break	
Wicket-keepers
6	Harry Duke	England	6 September 2001 (age 25)	Right-handed	—	
48	Joe Cracknell	England	16 March 2000 (age 26)	Right-handed	—	
Bowlers
2	Naavya Sharma	England	10 September 2005 (age 21)	Right-handed	Right-arm fast-medium	
7	Tom Helm*	England	7 May 1994 (age 32)	Right-handed	Right-arm fast-medium	
10	Noah Cornwell	England	10 September 2004 (age 22)	Left-handed	Left-arm fast-medium	
13	James Feldman	England	13 June 2007 (age 19)	Right-handed	Right-arm fast-medium	
16	Sebastian Morgan	England	30 August 2007 (age 19)	Right-handed	Right-arm fast-medium	
19	Blake Cullen	England	19 February 2002 (age 24)	Right-handed	Right-arm fast-medium	
21	Toby Roland-Jones* ‡	England	29 January 1988 (age 38)	Right-handed	Right-arm fast-medium	
22	Ishaan Kaushal	England	9 February 2002 (age 24)	Right-handed	Right-arm fast-medium	
77	Zafar Gohar ‡	Pakistan	1 February 1995 (age 31)	Left-handed	Slow left-arm orthodox	Domestic player
Source: Updated: 27 September 2026

== Club presidents ==
- George Byng, the 3rd Earl
  of Strafford 1866–1898
- Edward Walker 1899–1906
- Russell Walker 1907–1922
- Alexander Webbe 1923–1936
- Plum Warner 1937–1946
- Frank Mann 1947–1949
- Dick Twining 1950–1957
- Gerry Crutchley 1958–1962
- George Newman 1963–1976
- Gubby Allen 1977–1979
- Tagge Webster 1980–1982
- George Mann 1983–1990
- Denis Compton 1991–1997
- Mike Murray 1997–1999
- Ron Gerard 1999–2001
- Bob Gale 2001–2003
- Alan Moss 2003–2005
- Charles Robins 2005–2007
- Don Bennett 2007–2009
- Peter Parfitt 2009–2011
- Geoff Norris 2011–2013
- Clive Radley 2013–2015
- Harry Latchman 2015–2017
- John Emburey 2017–2019
- Mike Selvey 2019-2023
- Mark Ramprakash 2023-2025
- Naynesh Desai 2025 to date

== Club chairs ==
- George Mann 1975–1984
- Mike Murray 1984–1993
- Michael Sturt 1993
- Charles Robins 1994–1996
- Alan Moss 1996–1999
- Phil Edmonds 1999–2007
- Ian Lovett 2007–2016
- Mike O'Farrell 2016–2023
- Richard Sykes 2023 to date

== Board of directors ==
=== Officers ===
- President Naynesh Desai
- Chair Richard Sykes
- CEO Andrew Cornish
- CFO Illa Sharma

=== Directors ===
- Steven Finn
- Andy Hunt
- Sahil Kher
- Natalie Salunke
- Ankit Shah
- Marilyn Smith
- Phil Stokes
- Marilyn Toft
- Lisa Whybrow

=== Observers ===
- Asif Ahmed
- Shiv Haria Shah
- Will Stone

== Club secretaries ==
- Percy Thornton
- Alexander Webbe 1900–1922
- Sir Pelham Warner
- Walter Robins 1935–1950
- George Mann 1951–1965
- Arthur Flower 1964–1980
- Alan Burridge 1980–1981
- Alan Wright 1982–1983
- Tim Lamb 1984–1987
- Peter Packham 1988–1989
- Joe Hardstaff 1989–1997

== Chief executive officers ==
- Vinny Codrington 1997–2015
- Richard Goatley 2015–2021
- Andrew Cornish 2021 to date
- Juile Harrington (Interim) 2026 to date

== Chief financial officers ==
- Illa Sharma 2021 to date

== Directors of cricket ==
- Alan Coleman 2022 to date

== Managing directors of cricket ==
- Angus Fraser 2009–2021

== Club coaches ==
- Jack Robertson 1960–1968
- Don Bennett 1969–1997
- John Buchanan 1998
- Mike Gatting 1999–2000
- John Emburey 2001–2006
- Richard Pybus 2007
- Toby Radford 2007–2009
- Richard Scott 2009–2018
- Stuart Law 2019–2021
- Richard Johnson 2022-2025
- Peter Fulton 2025-present

== Club scorers ==
- George Burton
- Joe Murrell 1946–1952
- Patsy Hendren 1952–1960
- Archie Fowler 1960
- Jim Alldis 1960–1968
- Jim Sims 1969–1972
- Harry Sharp 1973–1993
- Mike Smith 1994–2004
- Don Shelley 2005 to date

== See also ==
- Middlesex Cricket captains
- Middlesex First-class cricketers
- Middlesex List A cricketers
- Middlesex Twenty 20 cricketers
- Marylebone Cricket Club
- Middlesex Cricket Board
- The Hearne Family
- The Walkers of Southgate
- Uxbridge Cricket Club
