= Walter Robins =

English cricketer (1906–1968)

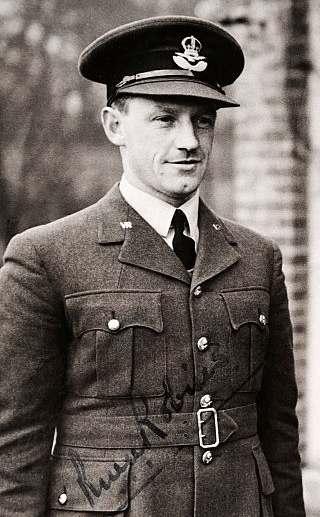
- Pilot Officer Walter Robins in around 1940

Personal information
- Full name: Robert Walter Vivian Robins
- Born: 3 June 1906; Stafford, England
- Died: 12 December 1968 (aged 62); Marylebone, London, England
- Batting: Right-handed
- Bowling: Leg break

International information
- National side: England
- Test debut: 29 June 1929 v South Africa
- Last Test: 17 August 1937 v New Zealand

Career statistics
| Competition | Test | First-class |
|---|---|---|
| Matches | 19 | 379 |
| Runs scored | 612 | 13,884 |
| Batting average | 26.60 | 26.39 |
| 100s/50s | 1/4 | 11/73 |
| Top score | 108 | 140 |
| Balls bowled | 3,318 | 43,215 |
| Wickets | 64 | 969 |
| Bowling average | 27.46 | 23.30 |
| 5 wickets in innings | 1 | 54 |
| 10 wickets in match | 0 | 4 |
| Best bowling | 6/32 | 8/69 |
| Catches/stumpings | 12/– | 217/– |
- Source: CricInfo, 16 April 2021

Robert Walter Vivian Robins (3 June 1906 – 12 December 1968) was an English cricketer and cricket administrator, who played for Cambridge University, Middlesex, and England. A right-handed batsman and right-arm leg-break and googly bowler, he was known for his attacking style of play. He captained both his county and his country; after the Second World War, he served several terms as a Test selector.

Born into a cricketing family, Robins attended Highgate School, where he earned a reputation as one of the outstanding schoolboy cricketers of his generation. He made his debut in first-class cricket, for Middlesex, in 1925. At Cambridge he won cricket "blues" in each of his three years, 1926 to 1928. He played his first Test match, against South Africa, in 1929, and thereafter played intermittently for England in each of the seasons up to 1937 – he played all his cricket as an amateur, which constrained his availability for both county and country. He toured Australia as vice-captain to G.O. Allen in 1936–37, and assumed the captaincy of the international side for three matches in 1937. He captained Middlesex from 1935 to 1938, again after the war in 1946 and 1947, and for a final season in 1950. In 1947 he led Middlesex to the County Championship.

Robins was a member of the Test selectors' panel in 1946–48, in 1954, and finally in 1962–64 when he acted as chairman. He was controversially involved in an unsuccessful attempt, in 1954, to replace the current England captain, Len Hutton, with the young and inexperienced David Sheppard. He was a strong advocate of "brighter cricket", to an extent that sometimes failed to recognise the realities of international cricket in the postwar era, and put him at odds with the players of a later generation. This problem was evident when Robins served as manager of the touring team to the West Indies in 1959–60, when his forthright, autocratic approach adversely affected his relationship with the team's captain and vice-captain, Peter May and Colin Cowdrey.

Whatever his difficulties in coming to terms with the cricket of a later era, Robins was widely recognised as one of the most dynamic cricketers of his time, a fact that was acknowledged in the tributes paid after his death, in 1968, by his former playing colleagues. His son, Charles Robins, played for Middlesex from 1953 to 1960, as a leg-spin and googly bowler in the manner of his father.

== Early life ==
Robins was born in Stafford on 3 June 1906. His father was Vivian Harry Robins (1880–1963), who played Minor Counties cricket for Staffordshire before the First World War as a leg-break bowler and right-handed batsman – characteristics which his son would also develop. In 1917 the family moved to London, where Walter Robins attended Highgate School. He was coached at cricket first by his father, to whom he would later attribute much of his eventual success, and, at Highgate, by the former England player Albert Knight. He also played club cricket for East Molesey.

Attending Highgate from April 1921 until July 1925, Robins was four years in the football XI (captain for the last two), three years in the Eton Fives VI (captain for the last two) and was in the cricket first XI from 1922 to 1925, again being captain in his last two years; in 1925 he scored 816 runs for a batting average of 62.76, and took 60 wickets at a bowling average of 15.18. These figures included a score of 206 against Aldenham School; his all-round performances made him, according to Wisden, "one of the great schoolboy players of the year". In the summer of 1925, before entering Cambridge University, Robins made his debut in first-class cricket, when he appeared for Middlesex in the County Championship. The match was on 19 August, against Worcestershire. He was out for 0 in his only innings, and did not bowl.

== Playing career ==
=== Cambridge University ===
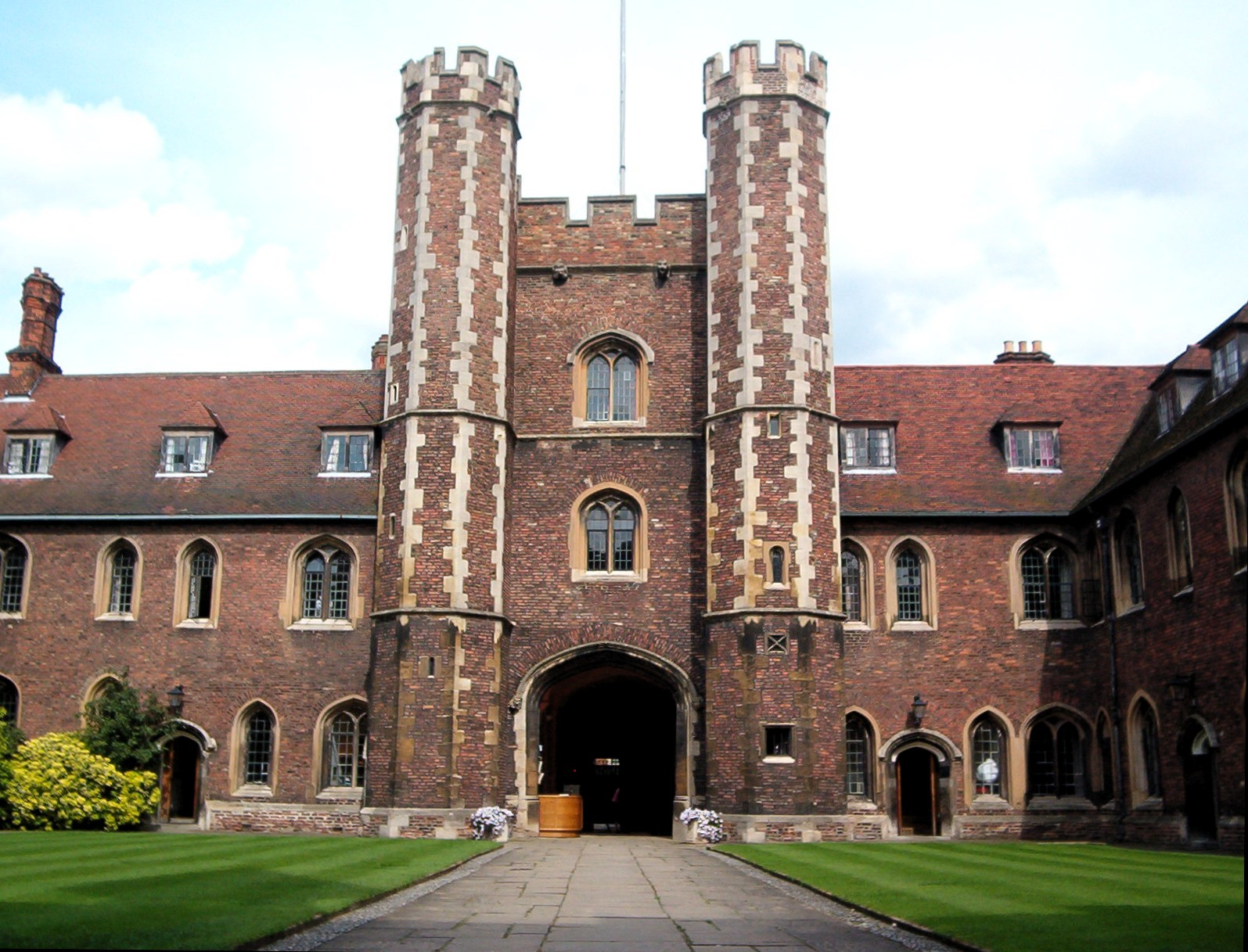
Queens' College, Cambridge

Robins was awarded a scholarship to Queens' College, Cambridge, joining in October 1925; in the following summer he gained his cricket "blue" as a freshman. At this stage he was seen purely as a batsman; in the 1926 University match against Oxford he made scores of 37 and 21 not out and did not bowl. In the following year against Oxford his scores were 55 and 41, but this effort was passed in 1928, when he scored 53 and 101 not out, and also made an impact as a bowler, with 8 wickets in the match. His development as a bowler may have been assisted by a spell he underwent, in 1926, at the Aubrey Faulkner cricket school. His performance in the 1928 University match earned him a place in the Gentlemen's team, in the historic Gentlemen v. Players fixture at Lord's in June 1928, but here he was largely unsuccessful, taking no wickets and making little impact as a batsman.

In addition to his cricket prowess, Robins was a competent Association footballer, who played for Cambridge in each of his years at the university, being captain of the side in 1927. A right-winger, he also played football for the Corinthians and Nottinghamshire, prominent amateur teams, and later represented the professional side, Nottingham Forest, in two Football League matches, each on Christmas Day, 1929 and 1930.

=== Middlesex ===
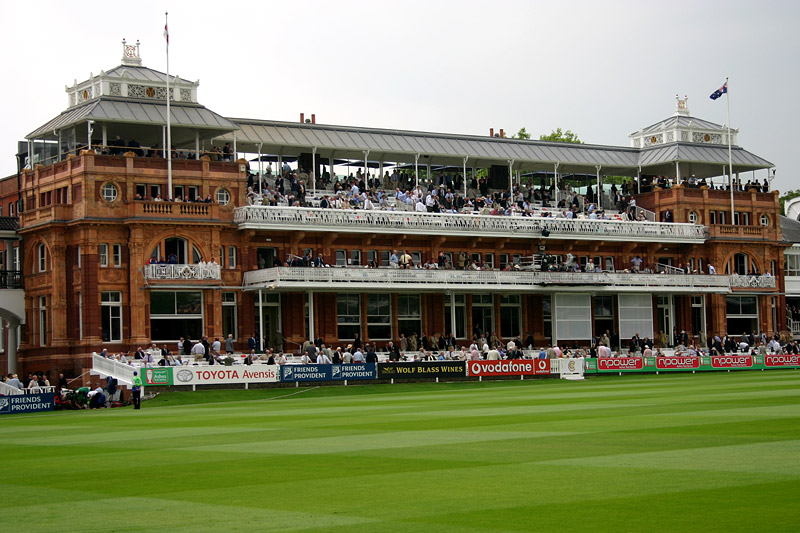
The pavilion at Lord's home of Middlesex County Cricket Club (2005 photograph)

Robins's career with Middlesex extended from 1925 to 1951. After leaving Cambridge, he played his first full season for the county in 1929, scoring 1,134 runs and taking 162 wickets, thus performing the "cricketer's double" – the only time in his career that he achieved this feat although, as Wisden records, he came near to repeating it on several occasions. Robins's positive batting, with the emphasis on attack, combined with his inventive bowling, made him a popular favourite with crowds. His highest score for the county was 140, against Cambridge University in 1930, and his best bowling return was 8 wickets for 69, against Gloucestershire in 1929. He twice performed hat-tricks: first against Leicestershire in 1929, and again against Somerset in 1937. He was also recognised as a brilliant fieldsman, often in the covers but equally, in the deep field.

Robins was one of Wisden's five "Cricketers of the Year" in 1930. In its citation, Wisden described him as "a remarkable young cricketer of whom the best has quite possibly not yet been seen". In 1935 he assumed the captaincy of the county and, according to his Wisden obituarist, "transformed a hitherto drab Middlesex side". The cricket historian Alan Gibson describes how he "galvanised" the team. For the first time since the early 1920s, Middlesex became serious contenders for the County Championship, finishing third in 1935, and as runners-up in each of the next three seasons, with a particularly close finish behind Yorkshire in 1937. Robins relinquished the captaincy at the end of the 1938 season, but resumed it in 1946 and 1947, after the Second World War, and in 1947 finally led Middlesex to the championship title. He took charge of the county again in 1950, after which, following a single appearance in 1951, he left the first-class county game. This was not quite the end of his Middlesex cricket; in 1952 and 1953 he played fairly regularly for the Second XI in Minor Counties matches.

=== England ===
After playing in the Test Trial match in June 1929, Robins was selected for the second Test against the visiting South Africans, beginning at Lord's on 29 June. He did nothing of note in the match, and was not chosen again during the series. In the following season, he was included in the side to face the Australians in the first Test of the 1930 series, at Nottingham on 13 June. During the Australians' second innings, as they chased 429 runs to win the match, Robins took the key wicket of Don Bradman, helping to ensure an England victory. In the second Test, at Lord's, Australia scored 729 for 6 declared (Bradman 254), the record score for a Test at Lords; Robins's bowling figures were 1 for 172 runs off 42 overs. Robins batted as England struggled to save the match – they eventually lost it by 7 wickets – and was criticised for his impetuous running between the wickets, after he almost ran out Percy Chapman, his captain. He was dropped for the remainder of the five-match series, although some critics thought it was a mistake to drop one whom they considered "the best of our young all-rounders".

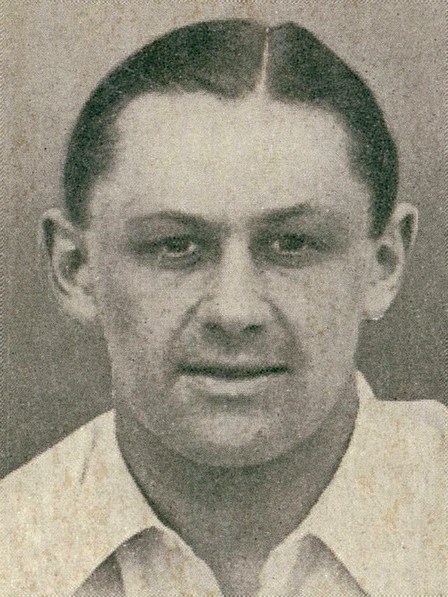
G. O. Allen, Robins's captain in Australia, 1936–37

However, Robins remained in the selectors' minds, and was chosen for at least one Test in each of the subsequent summers except 1934, until 1937. His best Test bowling performance was 6 for 32 against the West Indies in 1933; two years later he scored his only Test century, 108 against South Africa. He was selected for the 1932–33 Australian tour, under Douglas Jardine, but had to decline because of his business commitments. In 1936–37, however, he was able to go to Australia, as vice-captain to G.O. Allen. It was not a happy tour for Robins. Early on he broke a finger, which affected both his ability to spin the ball and his batting grip; as a result, he had little success with bat or ball, although Wisden records that he "fielded magnificently". England won the first two matches of the five-match Test series; in the third Test, at a crucial point in the Australians' second innings, Robins dropped Bradman. He apologised to his captain; Allen is said to have replied: "Don't give it a thought, Walter. You've probably cost us the Ashes". Bradman went on to score 270, Australia won the match and the next two, to take the series. (Note: Allen's words are sometimes recorded slightly differently; for example, Swann (2018) has him saying "Oh, don't give it another thought, old boy. You've just cost us the Ashes, that's all. Swann tells the same story, with almost the same wording, against Graham Thorpe when Thorpe dropped Matthew Elliott in the fourth Test against Australia in 1997.)

In 1937, Allen was unable to play much, so the captaincy for the three-match series against New Zealand devolved on Robins. England won the series 1–0, with two Tests drawn. Robins considered his appointment as a stop-gap, until Allen's return; in the event, the captaincy passed to Walter Hammond, who in November 1937 changed his status from professional to amateur, in order to fulfil what was then an inviolable condition for appointment to the England captaincy. The 1937 season thus ended both Robins's captaincy and, as it turned out, his Test career, although during the following ten years his name was from time to time mentioned in connection with the captaincy. In 1948, when the Australians were again in England, Robins was included in the Test Trial which preceded the series. He was unsuccessful in his only innings, and did not bowl; the captaincy remained with Norman Yardley. Towards the end of the series, when England were 3–0 down, there was talk of replacing Yardley with Robins in the final Test, but the idea came to nothing.

Altogether, Robins played in 19 Tests, scoring 612 runs (1 century, 4 fifties) for a batting average of 26.60, and taking 64 wickets for a bowling average of 27.46. He held 12 catches.

=== Other teams ===
In March 1930 Robins toured Argentina with Sir Julien Cahn's XI, playing in three representative matches. He toured again with Cahn's team, to Canada, Bermuda and the United States in 1933. After the Second World War, in 1951, he led an MCC team which toured Canada. Following his retirement from county cricket he played occasional first-class matches during the 1950s, for the Free Foresters, the MCC, and other teams. His final first-class game was for the MCC against Ireland, in Dublin in 1958, when he was 52 years old.

In all first-class cricket Robins scored 13,844 runs for a batting average of 26.39, including 11 centuries with a highest score of 140. As a bowler he took 969 wickets, average 23.30, taking 10 wickets in a match on four occasions. He also held 217 catches.

== Test selector ==
After the Second World War, Robins served on three separate occasions as a member of the England Test selectors' panel: 1946–48, under the chairmanship first of Sir Stanley Jackson and then A.J. Holmes; 1954, when Harry Altham was chairman; and 1962–64, when Robins himself chaired the panel.

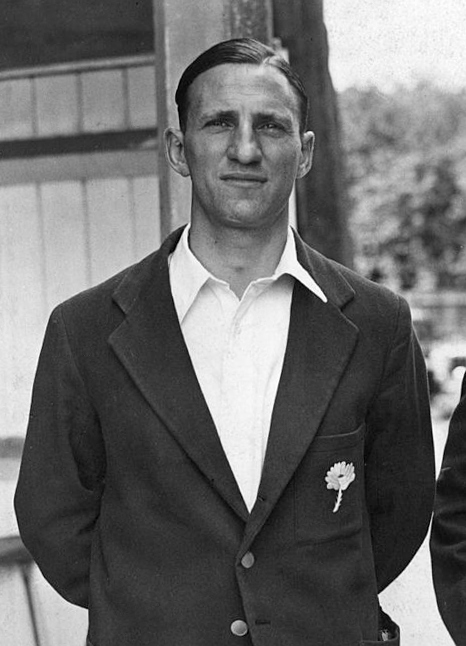
Len Hutton, dropped from the Test side in 1948

As a selector in 1948, Robins was involved in two controversial decisions: the dropping of Hutton for the third Test of the 1948 series against Australia, and the omission of Doug Wright from the fourth Test of the same series. Hutton was dropped on the grounds that he had displayed deficiencies against the pace of the Australian bowlers Ray Lindwall and Keith Miller. His replacement was the Gloucestershire batsman George Emmett, who scored 10 and 0 in the match; Hutton was speedily reinstated. Wright's omission from the Leeds Test, which deprived England of the services of their leading spinner probably, in the view of the cricket historian Simon Wilde, cost them victory in the match.

In 1954, Robins promoted the idea that for the forthcoming 1954–55 tour of Australia, Hutton, who had been appointed two years earlier as England's first professional captain in the 20th century, should be replaced by David Sheppard, his deputy in two Tests against the 1954 Pakistan side when Hutton was unwell. The ostensible reason given was to enable Hutton to concentrate on his batting, though some saw the move as reflecting the continuing antagonism of the old cricketing "establishment" to the advent of a professional captain. The matter was resolved in Hutton's favour, and he duly led the side to victory in Australia.

As chairman from 1962, Robins let it be known that he favoured positive play: "Play aggressively at all times; otherwise you will not be chosen for England". Wisden records that, in terms of England's results during this period, this ultimatum had limited effect, though "at least it relieved Test cricket of some of the stagnation which threatened its popularity at the time". In 1962, Robins again raised the prospect of Sheppard's captaincy, in relation to the 1962–63 Australian tour. At this stage Sheppard, by now an ordained clergyman in charge of the Mayflower Centre in London's Docklands, had not played Test cricket for five years. He was, however, willing to go if chosen and, in a demonstration of his current form, scored a century in the Gentlemen v. Players fixture. Despite this, and Robins's advocacy, the captaincy went to Ted Dexter. (Note: Wilde argues that one factor in Sheppard's non-appointment was his declared opposition to the racial apartheid policies in South Africa which, some felt, might lead to embarrassment in Australia if, for example, he was questioned about the then-current "White Australia" policy.)

Robins's selectorial approach did not impress all of his fellow-selectors. Alec Bedser, in an interview with Frank Keating many years later, remembered: "We would meet at his flat on a Sunday morning. He never really watched any cricket. Just went by what he read in the papers or heard from his cronies. He would turn up to the first day of a Test, but on the second day, after lunch, he'd sometimes clear off and go to the pictures".

== Tour manager ==
When England toured the West Indies early in 1960, under the captaincy of Peter May, Robins was appointed as tour manager. In terms of results the tour was successful – England won the five-match Test series 1–0 – but Robins was less felicitous in his managerial role. He failed to form a satisfactory relationship with May, or with the other players. According to Colin Cowdrey, May's vice-captain, almost before the ship carrying the party had left British waters Robins was seeking to impose his ideas of "military discipline" on the side, and telling May how the team should be run. May fell ill during the tour, and Cowdrey assumed the leadership. In the final Test of the series, which was heading for a draw, Robins tried to persuade Cowdrey to "make a game of it", but Cowdrey chose to protect England's series lead and play cautiously. Afterwards, to the team's dismay, Robins came to the dressing room and publicly castigated Cowdrey, in front of the players, for his lack of spirit. This was too much for England's leading fast bowler, Fred Trueman who, according to another player's account, ordered Robins out of the room: "You ain't no bloody business in 'ere. Get out!".

== Personal life ==
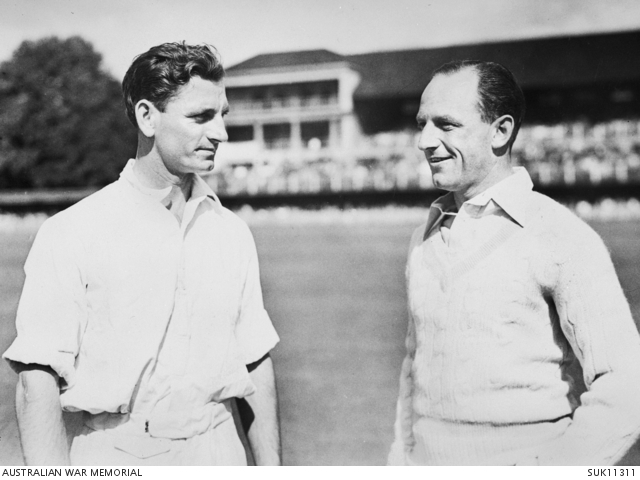
Robins (right) and Carmody at Lord's, England XI v Dominions, 1943

Robins played all his cricket as an amateur and, not being independently wealthy, had to find employment when he left Cambridge in 1928 without taking a degree. As a result, business commitments often restricted Robins's ability to pursue his cricket career, both at county and international level. Initially he worked for Sir Julien Cahn in the latter's furniture business. Cahn, an avid cricket enthusiast, employed numerous cricketers who formed the backbone of his private XI, which played first-class cricket throughout the 1930s. Later, Robins worked in Stafford, Knight & Co. Ltd., a successful family Lloyd's insurance brokerage in the City, which was probably established with Cahn's help. He went on to become managing director and later chairman.

During the Second World War, Robins served in the Royal Air Force Volunteer Reserve, reaching the rank of squadron leader. He played cricket when he could, and in 1943, in a two-day match at Lord's, captained an England XI against a Dominions XI led by the Australian Keith Carmody. The Dominions team included the future Australian Test all-rounder Keith Miller, and the West Indies Test bowler Learie Constantine. In a close game the England XI were victorious by eight runs.

Various members of the Robins family contributed to cricket, for Middlesex and elsewhere. Walter's younger brother, William Vernon Harry, a career Army officer, played several first-class matches for the Army during the 1930s.

Walter Robins's son, Robert Victor Charles, known as Charles Robins and, like his father, a leg-spin and googly bowler, was captain of the Eton XI in 1953, and played for Middlesex between 1953 and 1960. Walter's grandson Charles William Veral (born 1965) played for Middlesex 2nd XI in 1983.

After his playing days ended, Robins continued to serve Middlesex as a member of its general and cricket committees. He died from bronchopneumonia, aged 62, on 12 December 1968.

== Appraisal ==
In its 1969 obituary tribute, Wisden acknowledges Robins as "one of the most dynamic cricketers of his time", who maintained an "aggressively enterprising" attitude towards the game: "Impatient of dull cricket, Robins wasted few scoring opportunities as a batsman, employing his nimble footwork and flexible wrists to the full, especially in cutting and driving". There was some early criticism of his effectiveness as a bowler – he sometimes tried to bowl too fast, and was erratic in maintaining length – but Wilde's analysis of English Test bowlers of leg-breaks and googlies shows Robins, at international level, to have been one of the most effective of this kind in terms both of wickets taken and of cost per wicket.

There were divided opinions on Robins's effectiveness as a selector. Doug Insole, who served with him between 1962 and 1964, considered that his judgement of a player was "excellent". Others were less sure; Wilde records that during Robins's first stint as a selector, 1946–48, the Australians were dismissive of his judgement, an opinion apparently shared by the former England captain Bob Wyatt, who "would have liked more intelligent people on the committee". Gibson is critical of Robins's efforts to replace Hutton as captain in 1954, an action which Wilde describes as "disloyal and unhelpful". It seems that Robins was not particularly popular with the players of a later generation, and that he made little effort to understand them. According to Wilde, Robins failed to recognise the extent to which, in the postwar era, international cricket had changed from his own heyday in the 1930s. It had, says Wilde, become much more tough and attritional, hence Robins's repeated calls for more attacking, brighter cricket were often inappropriate and doomed to failure.

Nevertheless, in the view of Billy Griffith, the cricket administrator and long-serving secretary of the MCC, Robins's "tremendous enthusiasm and deep knowledge of the game and its history made him the complete cricketer". Robins's Middlesex colleague Ian Peebles, who succeeded him as county captain in 1939, described him as "the most enthusiastic and joyous cricketer I played with".

== Notes and references ==
=== Sources ===
==== Books and journals ====
- Cooper, David (1999). "Canadians Declare "It Isn't Cricket": A Century of Rejection of the Imperial Game, 1860-1960". Journal of Sport History. 26 (1). University of Illinois Press: 51–81. JSTOR 43611718.
- Engel, Matthew, ed. (2014). The Highlights: The Best of Frank Keating. London: Faber & Faber. ISBN 978-1-7833-5019-3.
- Frindall, Bill (2010). The Wisden Book of Test Cricket. London: John Wisden & Co. ISBN 978-1-4081-2756-8.
- Gibson, Alan (1989). The Cricket Captains of England. London: The Pavilion Library. ISBN 978-1-851-453955.
- Swann, Graeme (2018). The Ashes (It's All About the Urn). London: Hodder and Stoughton. ISBN 978-1-4736-70853.
- Wilde, Simon (2013). Wisden Cricketers of the Year: A Celebration of Cricket's Greatest Players. London: Bloomsbury Publishing. ISBN 978-1-4081-40840.
- Wilde, Simon (2019). England: the Biography. London: Simon & Schuster. ISBN 978-1-4711-5485-0.

==== Online ====
- "1935 County Cricket Championship". Cricinfo.
- "1936 County Cricket Championship". Cricinfo.
- "1937 County Cricket Championship". Cricinfo.
- "1938 County Cricket Championship". Cricinfo.
- Chandler, Martin (8 March 2014). "Book review: Walter Robins: Achievements, Affections and Affronts. Brian Rendell, 2013". cricketweb.net.
- "Charles Robins". Cricinfo.
- "Charles Robins". Middlesex CCC archive.
- "County Championship Matches Played by Walter Robins". Middlesex CCC archive.
- "Cricketer of the Year 1930: Walter Robins". Cricinfo. (republished from Wisden Cricketer's Almanack 1930)
- Dhole, Pradip (14 February 2017). "Paul Gibb: the bespectacled wicket-keeper". Cricket Country.
- "England in Australia, 1936–37". Cricinfo. (republished from Wisden Cricketer's Almanack 1938)
- "First-class Oldest Players". The Association of Cricket Statisticians and Historians. 2019.
- Lillywhite, Jamie (14 July 2009). "Ashes memories: Lord's". BBC.
- Lynch, Steven (24 December 2012). "He was born on Christmas Day". ESPN.
- "Minor Counties Championship Matches Played by Walter Robins". Middlesex CCC archive.
- "Obituary: Walter Robins". Cricinfo. (republished from Wisden Cricketer's Almanack 1969)
- "Past Cricket Internationals and Blues". Queens' College, Cambridge.
- "Robert Victor Charles Robins". Middlesex CCC archive.
- "September ten: dropped catches". The Observer. 2 September 2007.
- "Test Cricket Selectors and Coaches: England". test-cricket-tours.
- "Vivian Robins". Cricinfo.
- "Walter Robins". Middlesex CCC archive.
- "Walter Robins, England". Cricinfo.
- "William Robins". Cricinfo.
- Williamson, Martin. "Bodyline timeline, July–October 1932". Cricinfo.

==== Match cards ====
- "Worcestershire v. Middlesex, 19–20 August 1925". Cricinfo.
- "Gentlemen v Players, Lord's, London, 18, 19, 20 July 1928". Cricinfo.
- "Middlesex v. Gloucestershire, 15–17 May 1929". Cricinfo.
- "England v. Rest of England, 8–11 June 1929". Cricinfo.
- "Argentina v. Sir Julien Cahn's XI, 18–19 March 1930". Cricinfo.
- "Argentina v. Sir Julien Cahn's XI, 22–24 March 1930". Cricinfo.
- "Argentina v. Sir Julien Cahn's XI, 29–31 March 1930". Cricinfo.
- "Cambridge University v. Middlesex, 17–20 May 1930". Cricinfo.
- "England XI v. Dominions, 1943". Cricinfo.
- "Rest of England v. England, 2–4 June 1948". Cricinfo.

Sporting positions
| Preceded by G.O.B.Allen | English national cricket captain 1937 | Succeeded by W.R.Hammond |
| Preceded by H.J.Enthoven and N.E.Haig | Middlesex cricket captain 1935–1938 | Succeeded by I.A.R.Peebles |
| Preceded by I.A.R.Peebles | Middlesex cricket captain 1946–1947 | Succeeded by F.G.Mann |
| Preceded by F.G.Mann | Middlesex cricket captain 1950 | Succeeded by D.C.S.Compton and W.J.Edrich |
