= English cricket team in South Africa in 1948–49 =

International cricket tour

The England national cricket team toured South Africa in the 1948-49 season. The tour was organised by the Marylebone Cricket Club and the side played five Test matches as England and 16 other first-class matches as "MCC". Two of the first-class matches took place in Rhodesia (now Zimbabwe). There were also two non-first-class matches.

England won the first and last Test matches; the other three were drawn. Though the margin of victory in both the England wins was small, Wisden was in no doubt that the better team had won: "Much less than justice would have been done if England had not won the rubber," it said. "In all five Tests clearly they were the superior team".

== England team ==
The MCC team was captained by George Mann, with Billy Griffith as vice-captain. The Worcestershire secretary Brigadier Michael Green was the tour manager.

The full team was:

George Mann; Billy Griffith (wicketkeeper); Alec Bedser; Denis Compton; Jack Crapp; Godfrey Evans (wicketkeeper); Cliff Gladwin; Len Hutton; Roly Jenkins; Charles Palmer; Reg Simpson; Maurice Tremlett; Cyril Washbrook; Allan Watkins; Doug Wright; Jack Young

== Test series summary ==
=== First Test ===
16–20 December 1948
(4-day match)
Scorecard

South Africa	v	England
161 (53.5 overs); AD Nourse 37; DW Begbie 37; AV Bedser 4/39 (13.5 overs)		253 (99.4 overs); L Hutton 83; NBF Mann 6/59 (37.4 overs)
219 (89.3 overs); WW Wade 63; DVP Wright 4/72 (26 overs)		128/8 (28 overs); DCS Compton 28; CN McCarthy 6/43 (12 overs)

England won by 2 wickets
Kingsmead, Durban
Umpires: RGA Ashman and GL Sickler

- South Africa won the toss and elected to bat.
- 19 December was taken as a rest day.
- OE Wynne, DW Begbie and CN McCarthy (all SA), and RT Simpson, FG Mann and RO Jenkins (all ENG) made their Test debuts.

=== Second Test ===
27–30 December 1948
(4-day match)
Scorecard

England	v	South Africa
608 (149.5 overs); C Washbrook 195; CN McCarthy 3/102 (26 overs)		315 (104.4 overs); B Mitchell 86; RO Jenkins 3/88 (21.4 overs)
		270/2 (f/o) (91 overs); EAB Rowan 156*; DVP Wright 1/35 (14 overs)

Match drawn
Ellis Park, Johannesburg
Umpires: JV Hart-Davis and GL Sickler

- England won the toss and elected to bat.

=== Third Test ===
1–5 January 1949
(4-day match)
Scorecard

England	v	South Africa
308 (91.2 overs); C Washbrook 74; AMB Rowan 5/80 (31.2 overs)		356 (119.2 overs); B Mitchell 120; DCS Compton 5/70 (25.2 overs)
276/3d (96 overs); L Hutton 87; CN McCarthy 2/75 (20 overs)		142/4 (31 overs); OE Wynne 46; RO Jenkins 4/48 (9 overs)

Match drawn
Newlands, Cape Town
Umpires: RGA Ashman and JV Hart-Davis

- England won the toss and elected to bat.
- 2 January was taken as a rest day.
- MA Hanley (SA) made his Test debut.

=== Fourth Test ===
12–16 February 1949
(4-day match)
Scorecard

England	v	South Africa
379 (105.7 overs); AJ Watkins 111; CN McCarthy 5/114 (35.7 overs)		257/9d (85 overs); AD Nourse 129*; C Gladwin 2/43 (24 overs)
253/7d (78.2 overs); L Hutton 123; AMB Rowan 4/69 (34 overs)		194/4 (65 overs); EAB Rowan 86*; AJ Watkins 2/16 (3 overs)

Match drawn
Ellis Park, Johannesburg
Umpires: RGA Ashman and JV Hart-Davis

- England won the toss and elected to bat.
- 13 February was taken as a rest day.
- LA Markham (SA) made his Test debut.

=== Fifth Test ===
5–9 March 1949
(4-day match)
Scorecard

South Africa	v	England
379 (143.5 overs); WW Wade 125; AV Bedser 4/61 (38 overs)		395 (141.4 overs); FG Mann 136*; AMB Rowan 5/167 (60 overs)
187/3d (58 overs); B Mitchell 56; JA Young 2/34 (23 overs)		174/7 (23.7 overs); DCS Compton 42; NBF Mann 4/65 (9.7 overs)

England won by 3 wickets
St George's Park, Port Elizabeth
Umpires: RGA Ashman and DV Collins

- South Africa won the toss and elected to bat.
- 6 March was taken as a rest day.
- JE Cheetham (SA) made his Test debut.
