= Australian cricket team in South Africa in 1949–50 =

International cricket tour

The Australia national cricket team toured South Africa from October 1949 to March 1950 and played a five-match Test series against the South African team. Australia won the Test series 4–0. Australia were captained by Lindsay Hassett; South Africa by Dudley Nourse.

== Australian team ==
- AL Hassett (Victoria) (captain)
- KA Archer (Queensland)
- RN Harvey (Victoria)
- IW Johnson (Victoria)
- WA Johnston (Victoria)
- GR Langley (South Australia)
- RR Lindwall (New South Wales)
- SJE Loxton (Victoria)
- CL McCool (Queensland)
- JR Moroney (New South Wales)
- AR Morris (New South Wales)
- G Noblet (South Australia)
- RA Saggers (New South Wales)
- AK Walker (New South Wales)

Don Tallon withdrew from the tour party before departure and was replaced by Saggers. Keith Miller was called into the tour party midway through the tour when Johnston was injured in a car crash.

== Test series summary ==
=== First Test ===
24–28 December 1949
(4-day match)
Scorecard

| Australia | v | South Africa |
| 413 (113.4 overs); AL Hassett 112; HJ Tayfield 3/93 (28 overs) | | 137 (56.2 overs); EAB Rowan 60; KR Miller 5/40 (15 overs) |
| | | 191 (f/o) (65.1 overs); AD Nourse 36; WA Johnston 6/44 (20.1 overs) |

Australia won by an innings and 85 runs
Ellis Park, Johannesburg
Umpires: RGA Ashman and DV Collins

- Australia won the toss and elected to bat.
- 25 December was taken as a rest day.
- J Moroney (AUS), and JD Nel, JC Watkins and HJ Tayfield (all SA) made their Test debuts.

=== Second Test ===
31 December 1949–4 January 1950
(4-day match)
Scorecard

| Australia | v | South Africa |
| 526/7d (126 overs); RN Harvey 178; NBF Mann 4/105 (28 overs) | | 278 (75.4 overs); EAB Rowan 67; CL McCool 5/41 (11.4 overs) |
| 87/2 (20 overs); AR Morris 24; NBF Mann 2/23 (8 overs) | | 333 (f/o) (102.4 overs); AD Nourse 114; RR Lindwall 5/32 (15.4 overs) |

Australia won by 8 wickets
Newlands, Cape Town
Umpires: RGA Ashman and DV Collins

- Australia won the toss and elected to bat.
- 1 January was taken as a rest day.

=== Third Test ===
20–24 January 1950
(4-day match)
Scorecard

| South Africa | v | Australia |
| 311 (109.2 overs); EAB Rowan 143; WA Johnston 4/75 (31.2 overs) | | 75 (28.4 overs); AR Morris 25; HJ Tayfield 7/23 (8.4 overs) |
| 99 (46.2 overs); OE Wynne 29; IWG Johnson 5/34 (17 overs) | | 336/5 (123.6 overs); RN Harvey 151*; NBF Mann 3/101 (51.6 overs) |

Australia won by 5 wickets
Kingsmead, Durban
Umpires: JV Hart-Davis and BV Malan

- South Africa won the toss and elected to bat.
- 22 January was taken as a rest day.

The Australian first innings had an unusual scoreboard - five batsmen scored two runs each, and another batsman was two not out.

=== Fourth Test ===
10–14 February 1950
(4-day match)
Scorecard

| Australia | v | South Africa |
| 465/8d (127 overs); J Moroney 118; MG Melle 5/113 (33 overs) | | 352 (122 overs); GM Fullerton 88; KR Miller 3/75 (28 overs) |
| 259/2 (52 overs); J Moroney 101*; CN McCarthy 1/56 (13 overs) |

Match drawn
Ellis Park, Johannesburg
Umpires: DV Collins and DT Drew

- Australia won the toss and elected to bat.
- 12 February was taken as a rest day.
- RG Draper, MG Melle and PL Winslow (all SA) made their Test debuts.

=== Fifth Test ===
3–6 March 1950
(4-day match)
Scorecard

| Australia | v | South Africa |
| 549/7d (117 overs); AL Hassett 167; HJ Tayfield 2/103 (25 overs) | | 158 (50.1 overs); NBF Mann 41; KR Miller 4/42 (14 overs) |
| | | 132 (f/o) (48.2 overs); AD Nourse 55; WA Johnston 3/10 (6 overs) |

Australia won by an innings and 259 runs
St George's Park, Port Elizabeth
Umpires: DV Collins and BV Malan

- Australia won the toss and elected to bat.
- 5 March was taken as a rest day.
- The match was scheduled for four days but completed in three.
- G Noblet (AUS) made his Test debut.
