= Martin Hanley =

South African cricketer (1918–2000)

Cricket information
- Batting: Right-handed
- Bowling: Right-arm offbreak

International information
- National side: South Africa
- Only Test: 1 January 1949 v England

Career statistics
Competition	Test	First-class
Matches	1	33
Runs scored	0	308
Batting average	0.00	9.62
100s/50s	0/0	0/0
Top score	0	38
Balls bowled	232	10,521
Wickets	1	182
Bowling average	88.00	21.69
5 wickets in innings	0	14
10 wickets in match	0	6
Best bowling	1/57	8/55
Catches/stumpings	0/–	27/–
- Source: CricketArchive, 15 November 2022

Martin Andrew Hanley (10 November 1918 – 2 June 2000) was a South African cricketer who played in one Test in 1949.

Hanley was a right-handed lower-order batsman and a right-arm off-break bowler. His single Test was the third match of the 1948–49 England tour series and he was the third spin bowler alongside Tufty Mann and Athol Rowan, with Rowan also bowling off-spin. He took just one wicket in the game and was dropped for the next match, being replaced by leg-spinner Fish Markham.

His nephew, Rupert Hanley, also played first-class cricket.
