= South African cricket team in England in 1951 =

International cricket tour

The South African cricket team toured England in the 1951 season to play a five-match Test series against England.

England won the series 3–1 with 1 match drawn.

== South African team ==
The South African team was captained by Dudley Nourse, with Eric Rowan as vice-captain. The manager was Sid Pegler who had toured England as a player with the South African cricket team of 1912 and 1924.

The full team was:

- Dudley Nourse, captain
- Eric Rowan, vice-captain
- Jack Cheetham
- Geoff Chubb
- Russell Endean, wicketkeeper
- George Fullerton
- Tufty Mann
- Percy Mansell
- Cuan McCarthy
- Jackie McGlew
- Roy McLean
- Michael Melle
- Athol Rowan
- Hugh Tayfield
- Clive van Ryneveld
- John Waite, wicketkeeper

Tayfield was not originally chosen, but joined the party in May when it was feared that Athol Rowan's health might not be up to a full tour. Fullerton had kept wicket on the 1947 tour, but did not keep wicket at all in this tour, being played as a batsman. Endean was used as the second wicketkeeper on this tour, including one Test, but then did not keep wicket when he toured England for a second time with the 1955 team.

Nourse, Fullerton, Mann and Athol Rowan had toured England with the 1947 team; Nourse and Eric Rowan had toured with the 1935 side. Cheetham, Endean, Mansell, McGlew, McLean, Tayfield and Waite returned to England with the 1955 side, and McGlew, McLean, Tayfield and Waite came back for a third time with the 1960 team.

Before this 1951 tour, Chubb, Endean, Mansell, McGlew, McLean, van Ryneveld and Waite had not previously played Test cricket. Chubb, McGlew, van Ryneveld and Waite made their Test debuts in the first Test of this tour, and the other three had all appeared in Test cricket by the end of the series. The only player on the tour who did not appear in any of the Tests was Tayfield, who had previously played Test cricket for South Africa in 1949–50.

== Test series summary ==
=== First Test ===
7–12 June 1951
(5-day match)
Scorecard

South Africa	v	England
483/9d (240 overs); AD Nourse 208; AV Bedser 3/122 (63 overs)		419/9d (163.2 overs); RT Simpson 137; CN McCarthy 4/104 (48 overs)
121 (51.4 overs); JE Cheetham 28; AV Bedser 6/37 (22.4 overs)		114 (65.2 overs); JT Ikin 33; AMB Rowan 5/68 (27.2 overs)

South Africa won by 71 runs
Trent Bridge, Nottingham
Umpires: HG Baldwin and F Chester

- South Africa won the toss and elected to bat.
- 10 June was taken as a rest day.
- JHB Waite, DJ McGlew, CB van Ryneveld and GWA Chubb (all SA), and W Watson (ENG) made their Test debuts.

=== Second Test ===
21–23 June 1951
(5-day match)
Scorecard

England	v	South Africa
311 (107.4 overs); DCS Compton 79; W Watson 79; GWA Chubb 5/77 (34.4 overs)		115 (64.5 overs); EAB Rowan 24; R Tattersall 7/52 (28 overs)
16/0 (3.5 overs); L Hutton 12*		211 (f/o) (96.2 overs); GM Fullerton 60; R Tattersall 5/49 (32.2 overs)

England won by 10 wickets
Lord's, London
Umpires: H Elliott and FS Lee

- England won the toss and elected to bat.
- The match was scheduled for five days but completed in three.

=== Third Test ===
5–10 July 1951
(5-day match)
Scorecard

South Africa	v	England
158 (84.3 overs); CB van Ryneveld 40; AV Bedser 7/58 (32.3 overs)		211 (85.3 overs); FR Brown 42; GWA Chubb 6/51 (26.3 overs)
191 (78.2 overs); EAB Rowan 57; AV Bedser 5/54 (24.2 overs)		142/1 (51.3 overs); L Hutton 98*; NBF Mann 1/5 (2.3 overs)

England won by 9 wickets
Old Trafford, Manchester
Umpires: HG Baldwin and FS Lee

- South Africa won the toss and elected to bat.
- 8 July was taken as a rest day.
- There was no play on the second day.
- RA McLean (SA) and TW Graveney (ENG) made their Test debuts.

=== Fourth Test ===
26–31 July 1951
(5-day match)
Scorecard

South Africa	v	England
538 (235.3 overs); EAB Rowan 236; FR Brown 3/107 (38 overs)		505 (224.5 overs); PBH May 138; AMB Rowan 5/174 (68 overs)
87/0 (49 overs); EAB Rowan 60*

Match drawn
Headingley, Leeds
Umpires: D Davies and H Elliott

- South Africa won the toss and elected to bat.
- 29 July was taken as a rest day.
- There was no play on the final day.
- PNF Mansell (SA), and FA Lowson, PBH May and DV Brennan (all ENG) made their Test debuts.

=== Fifth Test ===
16–18 August 1951
(5-day match)
Scorecard

South Africa	v	England
202 (106.3 overs); EAB Rowan 55; JC Laker 4/64 (37 overs)		194 (87 overs); DCS Compton 73; MG Melle 4/9 (10 overs)
154 (75.5 overs); EAB Rowan 45; JC Laker 6/55 (28 overs)		164/6 (62.1 overs); FR Brown 40; GWA Chubb 3/53 (28 overs)

England won by 4 wickets
The Oval, London
Umpires: F Chester and D Davies

- South Africa won the toss and elected to bat.
- The match was scheduled for five days but completed in three.
- WR Endean (SA) made his Test debut.
- In the second innings, L Hutton was dismissed obstructing the field, the first such dismissal in Tests.

== Annual reviews ==
- Playfair Cricket Annual 1952
- Wisden Cricketers' Almanack 1952
