= Owen Wynne (cricketer) =

South African cricketer

Personal information
- Full name: Owen Edgar Wynne
- Born: 1 June 1919; Johannesburg, Transvaal, South Africa
- Died: 13 July 1975 (aged 56) at sea, False Bay, South Africa
- Batting: Right-handed

International information
- National side: South Africa

Domestic team information
- Years: Team
- 1937-38 to 1946-47: Transvaal
- 1947-48 to 1958-59: Western Province

Career statistics
Competition	Tests	First-class
Matches	6	37
Runs scored	219	2268
Batting average	18.25	37.18
100s/50s	0/1	7/8
Top score	50	200*
Balls bowled	–	78
Wickets	–	–
Bowling average	–	–
5 wickets in innings	–	–
10 wickets in match	–	–
Best bowling	–	–
Catches/stumpings	3/-	20/-
- Source: Cricinfo

Owen Edgar Wynne (1 June 1919 – 13 July 1975) was a South African cricketer who played in six Tests from 1948 to 1950. He played first-class cricket in South Africa between 1938 and 1959.

== Life and career ==
Owen Wynne was an opening batsman. He played for Transvaal either side of World War II without consistent success. He scored 200 not out against Border in 1946–47, but in his other seven innings that season he made only 77 runs. He moved to Western Province for the 1947–48 season and was an immediate success, leading Western Province's batting with 458 runs at an average of 50.88.

He began the 1948–49 season in good form, scoring centuries against the touring English team in their first two matches: 108 and 8 for Western Province and 105 and 48 a week later for Cape Province. He played in the first three Tests, scoring 50 and 44 in the Third Test, but lost his place when Eric Rowan returned to the team for the Fourth Test. He had a similar experience the next season when Australia toured. He scored 138 for a South African XI in one of the early matches of the tour and played in the first three Tests, but again with little success.

Originally a journalist, he took up farming for a period, then returned to journalism. In July 1975 he, his wife, their son and two friends were lost at sea while yachting in False Bay, near Cape Town.
