= Denis Begbie =

South African cricketer

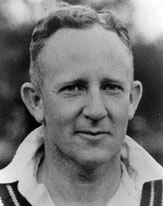

Personal information
- Full name: Denis Warburton Begbie
- Born: 12 December 1914; Middelburg, Transvaal, Union of South Africa
- Died: 10 March 2009 (aged 94); Johannesburg, South Africa
- Batting: Right-handed
- Bowling: Right-arm off-break; Right-arm leg-break and googly
- Role: All-rounder

International information
- National side: South Africa
- Test debut (cap 166): 16 December 1948 v England
- Last Test: 6 March 1950 v Australia

Domestic team information
- Years: Team
- 1933/34–1949/50: Transvaal

Career statistics
Competition	Test	First-class
Matches	5	58
Runs scored	138	2,727
Batting average	19.71	35.88
100s/50s	0/0	6/8
Top score	48	207*
Balls bowled	160	4,469
Wickets	1	88
Bowling average	130.00	23.69
5 wickets in innings	0	5
10 wickets in match	0	2
Best bowling	1/38	7/96
Catches/stumpings	2/–	27/–
- Source: CricketArchive, 10 March 2009

Denis Warburton Begbie (12 December 1914 – 10 March 2009) was a South African cricketer who played in five Test matches between 1948 and 1950. He played first-class cricket for Transvaal between the 1933–34 and 1949–50 seasons.

== Career ==
Begbie was a right-handed batsman and right-arm leg-spin bowler who could also bowl off-spin. He was selected for the South African tour of England in 1947, but did not play in any of the Test matches. He made his Test debut against England in December 1948 at the age of 34, playing the first three Tests of the five-match series. In the first Test he scored 37 and 48, falling both times to Alec Bedser, as England won by 2 wickets. In the second Test he was out for 5 as the match was drawn. In the third Test, he was run out for 18 as the match was again drawn. Begbie did not play the final two games of the series, which was won 2–0 by England.

He next played for South Africa in the fourth Test of the 1949–50 series against Australia. He was out for 24 to Keith Miller as the match was drawn. In the final Test of the series, he was out for 1 to Geff Noblet in the first innings and then to Bill Johnston for 5 in the second and took his only Test wicket, bowling Neil Harvey for 116. Australia crushed South Africa by an innings and 259 runs to seal a 4–0 series victory. This was Begbie's final Test match.

At the time of his death in March 2009, aged 94, Begbie was the third oldest Test cricketer still living, behind New Zealand's Eric Tindill and fellow South African Norman Gordon.
