= Roly Jenkins =

English cricketer

Personal information
- Full name: Roland Oliver Jenkins
- Born: 24 November 1918; Rainbow Hill, Worcester, England
- Died: 22 July 1995 (aged 76); Worcester, England
- Batting: Right-handed
- Bowling: Legbreak, googly

International information
- National side: England
- Test debut: 16 December 1948 v South Africa
- Last Test: 19 June 1952 v India

Career statistics
Competition	Test	First-class
Matches	9	386
Runs scored	198	10,073
Batting average	18.00	22.23
100s/50s	0/0	1/40
Top score	39	109
Balls bowled	2,118	59,571
Wickets	32	1,309
Bowling average	34.31	23.64
5 wickets in innings	1	92
10 wickets in match	0	20
Best bowling	5/116	8/62
Catches/stumpings	4/–	213/–
- Source: CricInfo, 26 June 2021

Roly Jenkins (24 November 1918 – 22 July 1995) was an English cricketer from the period immediately after World War II, almost exclusively for Worcestershire County Cricket Club as a leg spinner. Along with Doug Wright and Eric Hollies, Jenkins was a star of the last generation of English leg-spinners before a more defensive mindset, followed by failed rule changes like a standard 75 yards (68.6 m) boundary and then the advent of one-day cricket, all but killed off home grown wrist spinners.

Cricket writer, Colin Bateman, noted, "true to the leg-spinner's image, Roly Jenkins was one of the game's great characters and entertainers whose performances ebbed and flowed with how the mood took him. In an era when wrist-spinners flourished, Roly was one of the bigger spinners of the ball, if not always the most accurate".

== Life and career ==
Roland Oliver Jenkins was born in Rainbow Hill, Worcester in 1918. He first played for Worcestershire as a teenager in 1938, and established himself as a regular member of the team almost immediately. He was carefully nursed in his first three seasons – separated by six years with no county matches due to World War II – but some of his performances already showed he was potentially a leg-spinner of more than ordinary ability. Although he had not reached a half century before the war, 1947 saw him come rapidly to the front as a gutsy middle-order batsman with a full range of leg-side strokes, and the following year he continued this advance as a batsman and, as a bowler, improved so much that he was chosen for the tour to South Africa.

Although he did not do much in the Tests, Jenkins' vicious spin was deadly against slower-footed batsmen on hard South African pitches. Initially an orthodox leg break bowler, around this time Jenkins shifted to a grip akin to a seam bowler, which allowed him such a firm and close grip on the ball. This spin was so strong that it compensated for his lack of a top-spinner, and the fact that his googly was extremely easy to pick. Although he had neither the quick pace of Wright, or the artfulness of Hollies, Jenkins' spin and flight were so pronounced he surpassed both in the dry summer of 1949. Despite not playing a Test match, he took more wickets that season than any other bowler, and claimed a hat-trick in each innings against Surrey. This did not affect his batting: indeed, Jenkins reached 1,000 runs for the third successive year and was named one of the Cricketers of the Year by Wisden.

The following year saw Jenkins play in two Tests against the West Indies. In the first, he took nine wickets, but conceded almost 300 runs, whist in the second he took only one wicket and conceded 119 runs in just 24 overs on the featherbed Trent Bridge pitch. Jenkins was probably the only English spinner who might have spun the ball appreciably on the cast-iron Australian wickets of previous years, but despite speculation he would tour, Jenkins was not chosen probably because it was clear that Australia's fleet-footed batsmen would score extremely freely from him. His all-round work continued to be valuable for Worcestershire up to 1952, when he did the double for the second time, and played in two Tests against India with some success.

In his benefit year of 1953, Jenkins began superbly as a bowler but not only lost form with the bat so much that he averaged under ten an innings, but suffered a seriously chipped bone in his knee when bowling against Leicestershire late in June. This injury caused Roly to miss the remainder of the season, including his actual benefit match in the return with Leicestershire. 1954's very soft pitches were unsuited to him both with bat and ball. However, after a severe attack of fibrositis early in 1955, Jenkins returned to something like his best late that year, whilst in 1956 he took 101 wickets at a better average than ever before, and frequently captained his county due to England calls upon Peter Richardson. Jenkins was that season established as an enthusiastic "senior professional" although out of the running for higher representative honours. Apart from one match where he took eleven wickets, however, his skill deserted him in 1957, and Jenkins played only a few games in 1958 before his engagement was not renewed. Nonetheless, after retiring from first-class cricket, Jenkins played for fifteen years with West Bromwich Dartmouth in the Birmingham and District League, in the process establishing a reputation beyond that which he had as a county player.

Along with Derbyshire wicket-keepers Bob Taylor and George Dawkes, Jenkins is one of only three players who have reached ten thousand career runs while making only one century (against Nottinghamshire in 1948). Tony Lock reached that figure with a highest score of 89.

Throughout his career, Jenkins was noted for his obsessive perfectionism: he would typically begin practising bowling at seven o'clock in the morning, and he was known for always bowling in his cap (though he batted without one). In later years he was a popular and much admired umpire at Ombersley Cricket Club, where he frequently offered helpful advice to bowlers from both teams.

Jenkins died in July 1995, in Worcester, at the age of 76.
