= Neville Markham =

South African cricketer (1926–2000)

Personal information
- Full name: Neville Evelyn Markham
- Born: 1 February 1926; Mbabane, Swaziland Protectorate
- Died: 26 April 2000 (aged 74); Pietermaritzburg, KwaZulu-Natal, South Africa
- Batting: Right-handed
- Bowling: Right-arm fast
- Relatives: Fish Markham (brother)

Domestic team information
- Years: Team
- 1951-52 to 1956-57: Natal

Career statistics
Competition	First-class
Matches	23
Runs scored	365
Batting average	14.60
100s/50s	0/2
Top score	78
Balls bowled	3800
Wickets	62
Bowling average	25.90
5 wickets in innings	2
10 wickets in match	0
Best bowling	6/77
Catches/stumpings	17/0
- Source: Cricinfo, 12 December 2021

Neville Evelyn Markham (1 February 1926 – 26 April 2000) was a South African cricketer who played first-class cricket for Natal from 1951 to 1957.

Markham was a right-arm fast bowler and useful tail-end batsman. He took his best first-class bowling figures of 6 for 77 on his debut in 1951–52 against Western Province. His highest score was 78, also against Western Province, in 1955–56, when he also took 3 for 29 and 3 for 43 in an innings victory for Natal.

His older brother Lawrence, known as "Fish", played one Test match for South Africa in 1949. Both brothers were born in Swaziland Protectorate, and died in Pietermaritzburg a few months apart.
