= Jack Moroney =

Australian cricketer

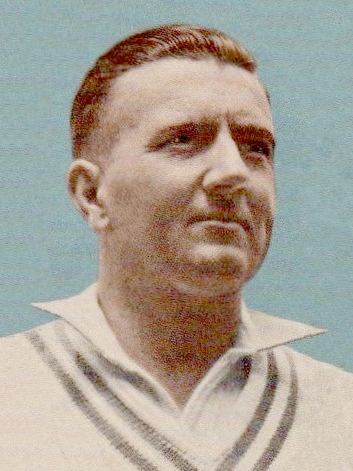
- Moroney on a 1948 card

Personal information
- Born: 24 July 1917; Macksville, New South Wales, Australia
- Died: 1 July 1999 (aged 81); Orange, New South Wales, Australia
- Batting: Right-handed

International information
- National side: Australia
- Test debut (cap 183): 24 December 1949 v South Africa
- Last Test: 31 December 1951 v West Indies

Career statistics
Competition	Test	First-class
Matches	7	57
Runs scored	383	4,023
Batting average	34.81	52.24
100s/50s	2/1	12/22
Top score	118	217
Catches/stumpings	0/–	19/1
- Source: Cricinfo, 14 October 2022

John Moroney (24 July 1917 – 1 July 1999) was an Australian cricketer who played in seven Test matches from 1949 to 1951.

Moroney was a solid Australian opening batsman who toured South Africa with success in 1949–50, making his maiden Test century and a second century in the same match. He failed in the First Test of the 1950-51 Ashes series, making a pair, and was dropped even though Australia won by 70 runs and other, more famous, batsmen failed. He was replaced as opener by Ken Archer and played only one more Test the next season against the West Indies.

His highest first-class score was 217, made in five and a half hours, for AR Morris' XI against AL Hassett's XI in 1948–49. However, he had a reputation for slow scoring; R. S. Whitington said he was "like a purposeless porpoise". The Australian cricket writer Johnnie Moyes said, "Moroney was a powerfully-built man who could hit the ball tremendously hard, but he often carried defence to extreme limits", adding that Moroney's fielding also let him down.

He worked as a school teacher.
