= Neil Harvey =

Australian cricketer (born 1928)

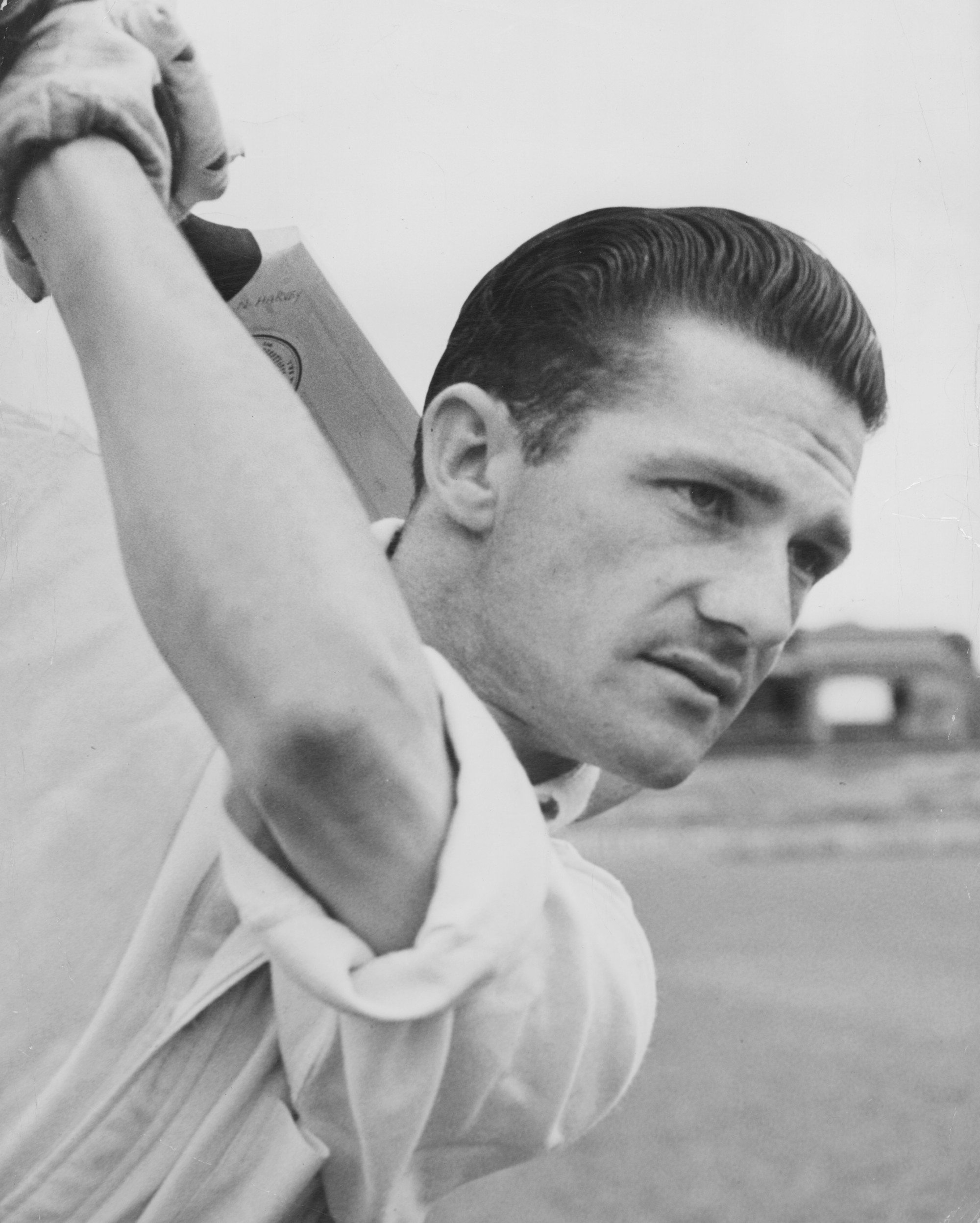
- Harvey in 1950

Personal information
- Full name: Robert Neil Harvey
- Born: 8 October 1928 (age 98); Fitzroy, Victoria, Australia
- Nickname: Ninna
- Height: 1.71 m (5 ft 7 in)
- Batting: Left-handed
- Bowling: Right-arm off-spin
- Role: Top-order batsman
- Relatives: Mick Harvey (brother); Ray Harvey (brother); Merv Harvey (brother)

International information
- National side: Australia (1948–1963)
- Test debut (cap 178): 23 January 1948 v India
- Last Test: 15 February 1963 v England

Domestic team information
- Years: Team
- 1946/47–1956/57: Victoria
- 1958/59–1962/63: New South Wales

Career statistics
Competition	Test	First-class
Matches	79	306
Runs scored	6,149	21,699
Batting average	48.41	50.93
100s/50s	21/24	67/94
Top score	205	231*
Balls bowled	414	2,574
Wickets	3	30
Bowling average	40.00	36.86
5 wickets in innings	0	0
10 wickets in match	0	0
Best bowling	1/8	4/8
Catches/stumpings	64/0	229/0
- Source: CricketArchive, 29 February 2008

Robert Neil Harvey (born 8 October 1928) is an Australian former cricketer who was a member of the Australian cricket team between 1948 and 1963, playing in 79 Test matches. He was the vice-captain of the team from 1957 until his retirement. An attacking left-handed batsman, sharp fielder and occasional off-spin bowler, Harvey was the senior batsman in the Australian team for much of the 1950s and was regarded by Wisden as the finest fielder of his era. Upon his retirement, Harvey was the second-most prolific Test run-scorer and century-maker for Australia.

One of six cricketing brothers, four of whom represented Victoria, Harvey followed his elder brother Merv into Test cricket and made his debut in January 1948, aged 19 and three months. In his second match, he became the youngest Australian to score a Test century, a record that still stands. Harvey was the youngest member of the 1948 Invincibles of Don Bradman to tour England, regarded as one of the finest teams in history. After initially struggling in English conditions, he made a century on his Ashes debut. Harvey started his career strongly, with six centuries in his first thirteen Test innings at an average over 100, including four in 1949–50 against South Africa, including a match-winning 151 not out on a sticky wicket. As Bradman's team broke up in the 1950s due to retirements, Harvey became Australia's senior batsman, and was named as one of the Wisden Cricketers of the Year in 1954, in recognition of his feat in scoring more than 2,000 runs during the 1953 tour of England.

In 1957, Harvey was passed over for the captaincy and was named as the deputy of Ian Craig, who had played just six matches, as Australia sought to rebuild the team with a youth policy following a decline in the team. Craig later offered to demote himself due to poor form, but Harvey prevented him from doing so. At any rate, Craig fell ill the following season, but Harvey had moved interstate, so Richie Benaud was promoted to the captaincy ahead of him. Harvey continued in the deputy's role until the end of his career, but he was captain for only one Test match. In the Second Test at Lord's in 1961, when Benaud was injured, Harvey led the team in the "Battle of the Ridge" on an erratic surface, grinding out a hard-fought victory. Only Bradman had scored more runs and centuries for Australia at the time of Harvey's retirement. Harvey was best known for his extravagant footwork and flamboyant stroke play, as well as his fielding. Harvey was particularly known for his innings in conditions unfavourable to batting, performing when his colleagues struggled, such as his 151 not out in Durban, his 92 not out in Sydney in 1954–55, and his 96 on the matting in Dhaka. In retirement, he became a national selector for twelve years but in recent times is best known for his strident criticism of modern cricket. In 2000, he was inducted into the Australian Cricket Hall of Fame in and selected in the Australian Cricket Board's Team of the Century. In 2009, Harvey was one of the 55 inaugural inductees into the ICC Cricket Hall of Fame.

== Early years ==
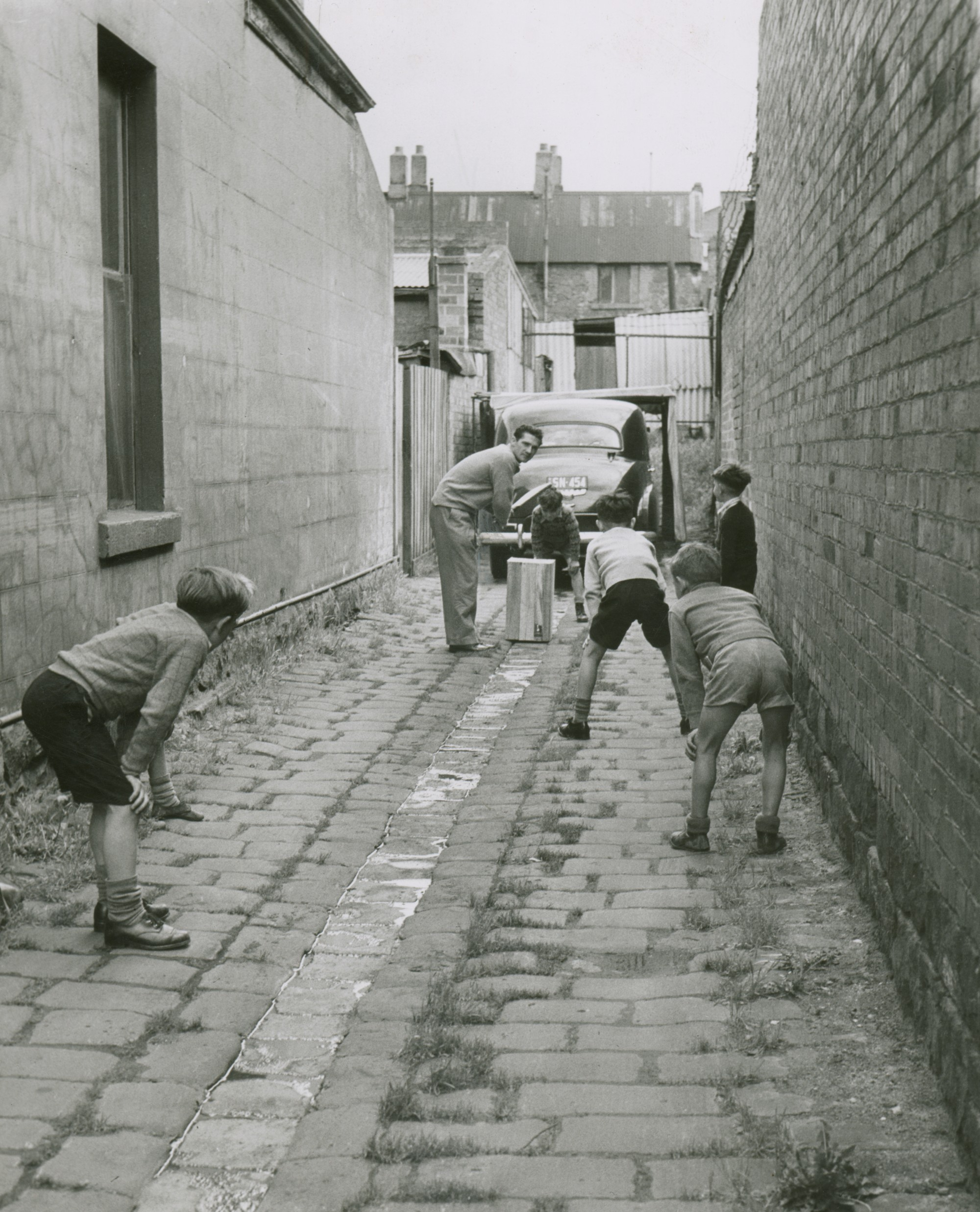
The laneway next to the family home in Fitzroy where the Harvey brothers learned to play cricket. In this photo, Harvey is recreating the event in 1950.

Harvey was the fifth of six boys born to Horace Harvey. Despite his small build, Harvey was born large, weighing in at 4.5 kilograms (10 lb). The family lived in Broken Hill, where Horace was a miner, before moving to Sydney, and finally to Melbourne in 1926, where they settled in the inner northern industrial suburb of Fitzroy. There the six boys were taught cricket under the guidance of their father. In conditions conducive to producing batsmen rather than bowlers, they played cricket using a tennis ball on cobblestones or a marble rebounding from the backyard pavement. The boys went to George Street State School and Falconer Street Central School. Cricket and cricket talk was an integral part of the daily family life. Horace held the family batting record with 198 for Broken Hill, and continued to play in Melbourne club cricket. Harvey's eldest brother Merv went on to play one Test for Australia, while Mick and Ray both played for Victoria. All six brothers, the other two being Brian and Harold, also played for Fitzroy in district cricket. Except for Harold, all five represented Victoria in baseball.

Harvey played his first game aged nine as a wicket-keeper in the North Fitzroy Central School team, the average age of which was 14. In a school final, he once made 112 of the total of 140. Aged twelve, he joined the local Fitzroy club and rose to the first-grade team when he was fourteen. By this stage, he had transferred to Collingwood Technical School. On the advice of the Victorian coach, Arthur Liddicut, Harvey stopped wicket-keeping to focus on his batting. Joe Plant, another Fitzroy veteran, also gave advice on batting. Both Liddicut and Plant identified Harvey's potential as a batsman. "What they liked about him was his modesty, his eagerness to pick up every point in the game, and his willingness to listen to the old hands." Briefly playing for Fitzroy Football Club, Harvey gave up the sport and played baseball during winter. After leaving school, Harvey worked as an apprentice fitter and turner for the Melbourne City Council. The apprenticeship was supposed to take three years, but it eventually took six years because Harvey's cricket career caused frequent absences.

First-class cricket had been cancelled during World War II and resumed in 1945–46. At the start of the season, Harvey was selected for a trial match. The Victorian state team played against the Rest of Victoria, and Harvey represented the latter. However, he made a duck in his only innings and was not selected for the senior state side during the season.

An aggressive 113 for Fitzroy against Melbourne Cricket Club in 1946–47 saw Harvey selected for the Victorian team at the age of 18. He made 18 in his only innings during his first-class debut against Tasmania. In the next match against Tasmania, Harvey made his maiden first-class century, scoring 154. He said that his effort was inspired by elder brother Merv, who gained Test selection in the same year.

At the time, Tasmania was not part of Sheffield Shield, and Harvey made his Shield debut against New South Wales. He was dismissed without scoring in the first innings before making 49 in the second innings in an emphatic 298-run win over their arch-rivals. Victoria went on to win the title convincingly.

Harvey’s next match for Victoria was against Wally Hammond's English tourists. After the fall of three early wickets, Harvey joined captain Lindsay Hassett. He dominated a partnership of 120, making 69 in his second match against the guileful leg spin of Doug Wright. His opponents had no doubt that he would become a Test player. English wicket-keeper Godfrey Evans congratulated him by proclaiming "We'll be seeing you in England next year [for Australia's 1948 tour of that country]". He ended his debut first-class season with 304 runs at 50.66.

== Test debut ==
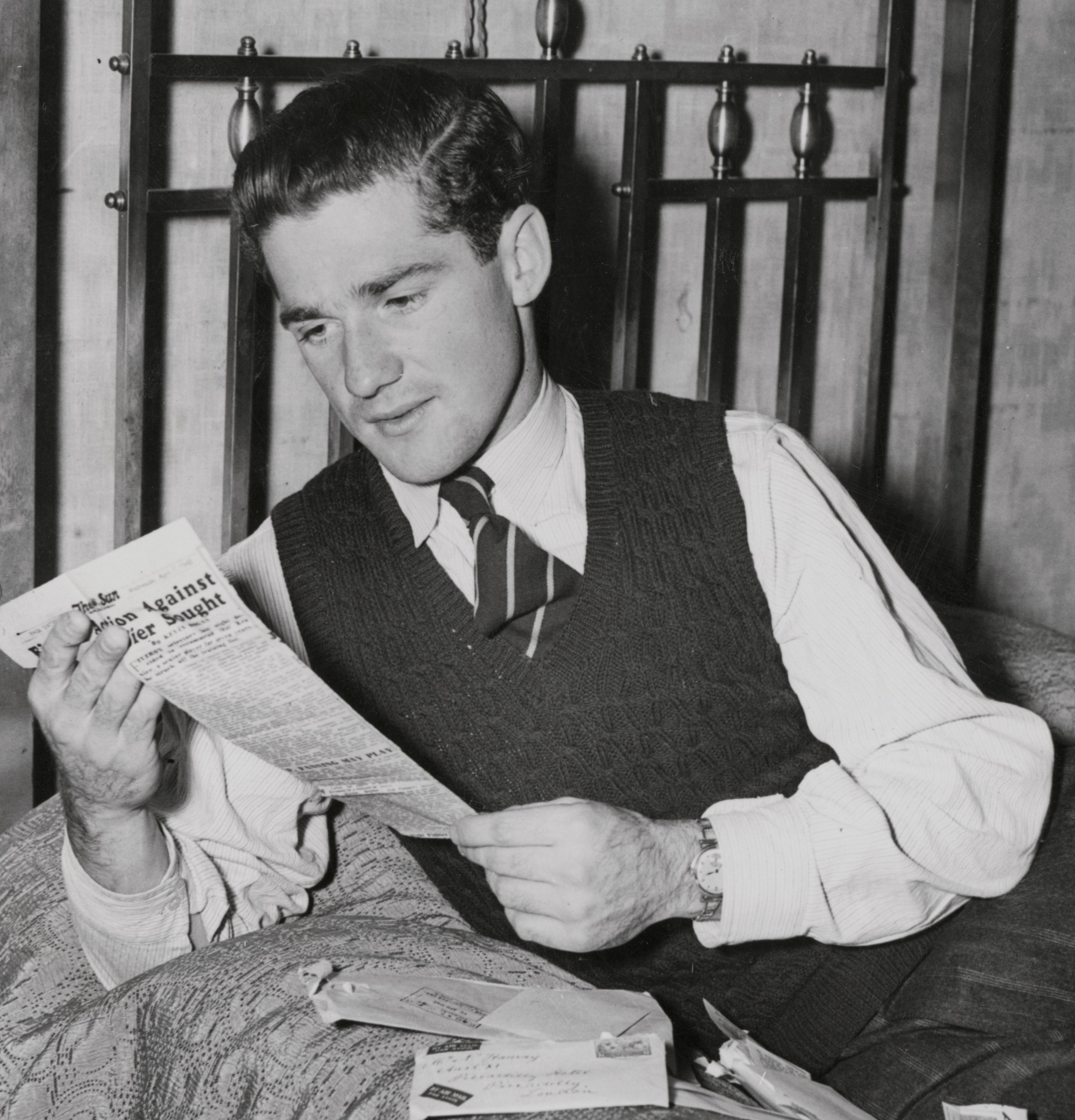
Harvey in 1948

In 1947–48, Harvey played in two Shield matches with his brothers Merv and Ray. Merv had already gained Test selection, but soon Neil was attracting more attention. In the opening match of the season, Harvey struck 87 against the touring Indian cricket team. He was selected for an Australian XI, which played the Indians before the Tests in what was effectively a dress rehearsal. He made 32 in the first innings and was unbeaten on 56 in the second as the hosts succumbed for 203 and suffered a 47-run loss. Despite this, he was initially overlooked for the Tests. He reached 35 in each of his next five innings for Victoria, including two fifties.

Three months after his 19th birthday, Harvey made his entry into international cricket, in the last two Tests against India. He batted at No. 6 and made 13 in his only innings on debut in the Fourth Test at the Adelaide Oval as Australia swept to an innings victory. The selectors retained him for the Fifth Test on his home ground at Melbourne. After reaching stumps on 78, he reached his century the following day, 7 February 1948. His score of 153 after being promoted to No. 5 made him the youngest Australian Test centurion, surpassing Archie Jackson's previous record. He brought up the mark with an all run five, having turned a short ball from Lala Amarnath towards the square leg boundary.

The innings in replacing Bradman was taken to be symbolism of the fact that Harvey had been tipped to become Australia's leading batsman. His innings laid the foundations that secured Australia another innings victory and a 4–0 series triumph. It was only his 13th match at first-class level.

The innings ensured him a place on the 1948 tour of England. Speaking about Harvey's selection, Bradman opined "He has the brilliance and daring of youth, and the likelihood of rapid improvement." In the warm-up matches before the team headed to England, Harvey struck 104 against Tasmania and 79 against Western Australia. He had scored 733 runs at 52.36 for the season.

Australia traditionally fielded its first-choice team in the tour opener, which was customarily against Worcestershire. Despite scoring a century in Australia's most recent Test, Harvey was made 12th man and it appeared that he was not initially in Bradman's Test plans.

At first, Harvey struggled in the English conditions, failing to pass 25 in his first six innings. His most notable contribution in the early stages of the campaign was against Yorkshire in Bradford, on a damp pitch that suited slower bowling. The match saw 324 runs fall for 36 wickets. No sooner had Harvey walked out to bat, stand-in captain Lindsay Hassett was caught to leave Australia at 5/20 in pursuit of 60. To make matters worse, Sam Loxton was injured and could not bat, so Australia were effectively six wickets down and faced its first loss to an English county since 1912. Harvey had scored a solitary run when he hit a ball to Len Hutton at short leg, who dived forwards and grabbed it with both hands before dropping it. Harvey then swept the next ball for a boundary. Colin McCool was out at 6/31 before Harvey and wicket-keeper Don Tallon steadied Australia. Harvey was reprieved on 12; he charged the bowling but the wicketkeeper fumbled the stumping opportunity. Harvey then hit the winning runs with a six over the sightscreen, ending unbeaten on 18 not out. It was the closest Australia had come to defeat for the whole tour.

Due to his weak performances in the opening matches, Harvey was omitted for the match against the Marylebone Cricket Club at Lord's. The MCC fielded seven players who would represent England in the Tests, and were basically a full strength Test team, while Australia fielded their first-choice team and went on to win by an innings. The omission signified that Harvey was on the outer with regards to Test selection.

After asking Bradman about his difficulties, Harvey was told that these were caused by rash shot selection and a tendency to hit the ball in the air. Bradman said "He was technically perfect in his shot production. He was batting well enough and simply getting out early."

Harvey adapted his style and improved his performance. He scored 36 and 76 not out against Lancashire at Manchester and an unbeaten 100 at Hove against Sussex in only 115 minutes in the last match before the First Test. Former Australian Test batsman Jack Fingleton described Harvey's innings as "a superb century, rich in youthful daring and stroke production". However, this was not enough for selection and reserve opener Bill Brown batted out of position in the middle-order, as he had done against Worcestershire and the MCC. Harvey was the 12th man because of his fielding abilities, and spent a large proportion of time on the field due to an injury to pace spearhead Ray Lindwall.

During the first two Tests, Brown struggled in his unfamiliar role, and he was dropped for the third. During the Third Test, opener Sid Barnes was injured, opening a vacancy for the Fourth Test at Headingley.

Harvey forced his way into the team with a scoring sequence of 49, 56, 43, 73* and 95. After Harvey hit 49 and 56 against Yorkshire, Fingleton opined that he "probably gained the respect of this most discerning crowd more quickly than any other cricketer in recent years". Harvey then scored 43 and 73 against Surrey and had taken a catch amongst a flock of pigeons. Australia wanted to finish the run-chase quickly so they could watch the Australian John Bromwich play in the Wimbledon tennis final. Harvey volunteered to play as a makeshift opener and promised Bradman that he would reach the target quickly. Australia chased down the target of 122 in just 58 minutes and 20.1 overs. Harvey ended unbeaten on 73 and the Australians arrived at Wimbledon on time. He then added 95 against Gloucestershire, attacking the off spin of Tom Goddard.

After England had amassed 496 in the first innings, Australia had slumped to 3/68 with Bradman one of the dismissed batsmen. Harvey, the youngest member of the squad, joined cavalier all-rounder Keith Miller. Australia were more than 400 behind and if England were to remove the pair, they would expose Australia's lower order and give themselves an opportunity to take a large first innings lead. Upon arriving in the middle, Miller greeted him cheerfully and said to Harvey, "OK, mate, get up the other end. I'll take the bowling for a while until you get yourself organised." Harvey said, "Mate, that will do me." I couldn't get up the other end quick enough. I watched him play a few overs and I thought, "This is good", and then they brought Laker on to bowl. The third and the fifth balls of Laker's over disappeared over my head, on the way up, and they both finished in the crowd for six. . . . I can honestly thank Keith Miller for the confidence he gave me during our partnership . . . and it did so much for my future cricket career."

The pair launched a counterattack, with Miller taking the lead and shielding Harvey from Jim Laker, as the young batsman was struggling against the off breaks that were turning away from him. Miller then hit a series of boundaries against Laker. This allowed Australia to seize the initiative, with Harvey joining the counterattack during the next over, hitting consecutive boundaries against Laker, the second of which almost cleared the playing area. By the time Miller was out for 58, the partnership had yielded 121 runs in 90 minutes, and was likened by Wisden to a "hurricane". Fingleton said that he had never "known a more enjoyable hour" of "delectable cricket".

Loxton came in at 4/189 to join Harvey, who continued to attack the bowling, unperturbed by Miller's demise. Australia went to lunch on the third day at 4/204, with Harvey on 70.

After lunch, Harvey accelerated after the second new ball was taken, and 80 minutes into the middle session, reached his century to a loud reception as Australia passed 250. Harvey's knock had taken 177 minutes and included 14 fours. The partnership yielded 105 in only 95 minutes. Harvey was eventually out for 112 from 183 balls, bowled by Laker while playing a cross-batted sweep. His shot selection prompted Bradman to throw his head back in disappointment. Harvey ended as the first Australian left-hander to score a century on his Ashes debut, in an innings noted for powerful driving on both sides of the wicket. The innings and the high rate of scoring helped to swing the match into a balanced position when Australia were finally dismissed for 458. In the second innings, Harvey took two noted catches, including one where he bent over to catch the ball at ankle height while running. Fingleton said that it "was the catch of the season—or, indeed, would have been had Harvey not turned on several magnificent aerial performances down at The Oval [against Surrey]". On the final afternoon, Harvey was at the crease and got off the mark by hitting the winning boundary in the second innings as Australia successfully completed a Test world record run chase of 3/404 in less than one day.

He had only one more innings in the series, scoring 17 in the Fifth and final Test at The Oval where Australia won by an innings. Harvey added centuries in consecutive matches after the Tests against Somerset and the South of England. In the entire first-class tour, he scored four centuries to aggregate 1129 runs at 53.76. Harvey was an acrobatic fielder, regarded as the best in the Australian team. Fingleton said that Harvey was "by far the most brilliant fieldsman of both sides, who was to save many runs in the field". He was twelfth man in the early Tests because of his fielding and he took several acclaimed catches throughout the tour.

== Consolidation ==
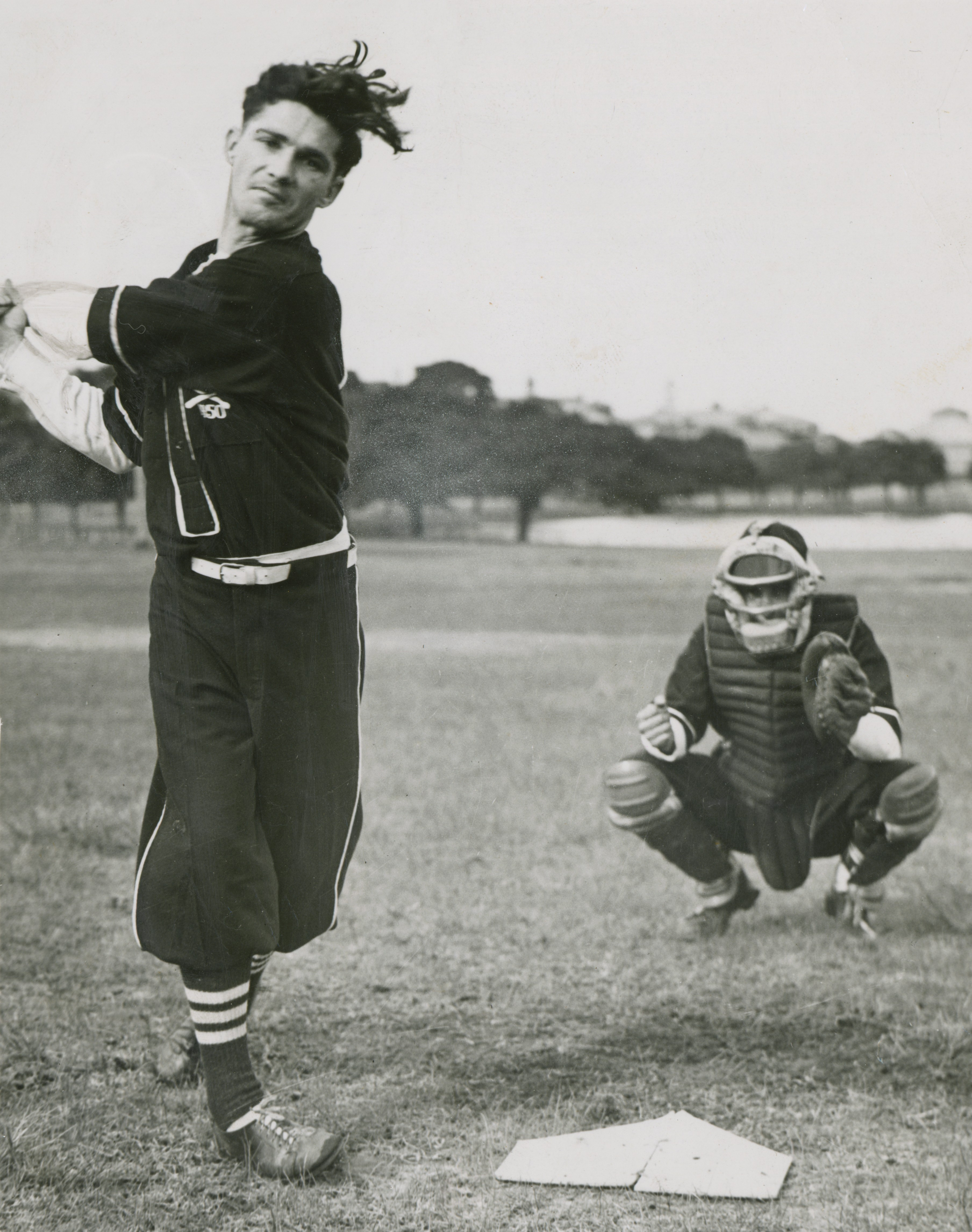
Harvey batting in 1950

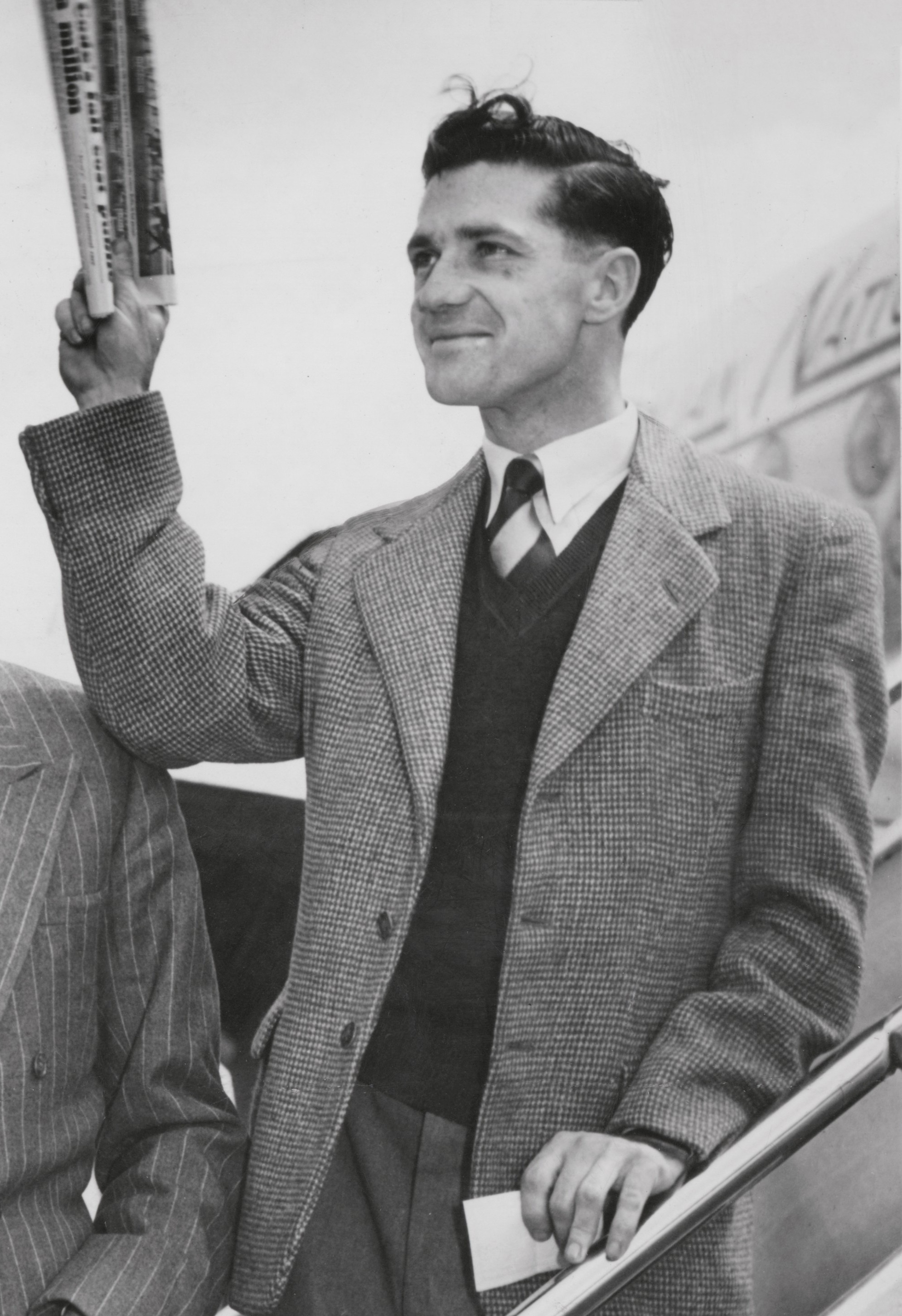
Harvey heading for the 1951–1952 Test series vs. West Indies

No international matches were scheduled for the 1948–49 Australian season, and Harvey had a disappointing first-class season, scoring only 539 runs at 33.68. He scored 72 and 75 in Victoria's totals of 165 and 197 as they lost to arch-rivals New South Wales by 88 runs, but his only other score beyond 50 was an 87 for Lindsay Hassett's XI in a Test trial at the end of the season. Nevertheless, the selectors persisted with him for the 1949–50 tour of South Africa.

Harvey was forced to shoulder more responsibility in the batting order now that Bradman had retired and Sid Barnes took an extended break. The youngest player in the team, Harvey rose to the challenge by establishing several Australian records. His Test figures of 660 at 132.00 was the most runs on a Test tour of South Africa by a visiting batsman, surpassing Len Hutton's previous mark by 83 runs, as were his 1,526 first-class runs at 76.30 and eight centuries on tour. His eight first-class centuries on one South African tour equalled the efforts of Denis Compton, Len Hutton and Arthur Morris.

Harvey started the tour well and was highly productive in seven first-class matches leading into the Tests. He scored 100 and 145 not out against North Eastern Transvaal and Orange Free State. There were two matches against a South African XI that were effectively dress rehearsals for the Tests. In the first, Harvey made 34 in an innings victory. He then made an even 100 in the second match, a week before the First Test. He had scored 480 runs at 60.00 in the matches leading up to the Tests.

After scoring 34 in the First Test at Johannesburg, Harvey amassed 178 in the first innings of the Second Test at Cape Town, which set up a first innings lead of 248 runs. He then scored 23 not out to guide Australia to an eight-wicket victory in the second innings. This was followed by an unbeaten 151 in five and a half hours at Durban, regarded as one of his finest Test innings. Having been dismissed for 75 on a wet wicket in the first innings, Australia had slumped to 3/59 in pursuit of a victory target of 336. On a crumbling, sticky pitch, the Australians were having extreme difficulty with the spin of Hugh Tayfield and faced their first Test defeat against South Africa for 39 years. Despite a few square cuts, Harvey adapted his game to play a patient innings, prompting heckling from spectators for the first time in his career. On 40, a ball from Tufty Mann broke through his defence and Harvey thought himself bowled, only to see that the ball had goven for byes. However, Mann and Tayfield began to tire in the heat and Harvey began to score more quickly, reaching 50 in 137 minutes by the lunch break. He registered his slowest ever century on his way to guiding his team to an improbable victory by five wickets. Harvey brought up the winning runs by clipping a ball from Mann to the midwicket boundary.

Harvey continued his productive sequence in the Fourth Test in Johannesburg, scoring an unbeaten 56 and 100 in a drawn match. It was the first Test in which Harvey had played that Australia did not win. After scoring 100 not out against Griqualand West, Harvey finished the series with 116 in the Fifth Test at Port Elizabeth, as Australia won by an innings and took the series 4–0. He had amassed four centuries in consecutive Tests in the series and had scored six in his first nine Tests, totally 959 runs at 106.55. Harvey's fast scoring made him a crowd favourite and marketing drawcard in South Africa. When Harvey was rested for a tour match in East London, media complaints prompted Australian selectors to reverse their decision. He finished the season with 55 in an Australian total of 55 before the tourists dismissed a South African XI for 49 and 90 to complete an innings victory.

Harvey's triple figure average from his first two Test seasons could not be maintained when Australia hosted the 1950–51 Ashes series. Following his success in South Africa, Harvey played regularly at either the No. 3 or No. 4 from that point onwards. He managed 362 runs at 40.22 with three half centuries as Australia took the series 4–1. Harvey had trouble with Alec Bedser's in-swingers in the early part of the series and Bedser was the only Englishman to dismiss Harvey in the first three Tests. On the first day of the series, Harvey top-scored with 74 out of Australia's 228. It turned out to be crucial as rain created a sticky wicket; England made 7/68 and Australia 7/32, both declared. Australia went on to win by 70 runs. The Second Test in Melbourne was also low scoring; Harvey made 42 and 31 as Australia won after neither team passed 200. He performed steadily through the series, with 39, 43 and 68 in the next two Tests, which were both won. He then made one and 52 in the Fifth Test defeat; it was the first in his 14 Tests and Australia's first since World War II and came on his home ground in Melbourne. Outside the Tests, Harvey scored 141 in a win over South Australia and then added 146 in the second innings of a match against New South Wales to stave off defeat. He ended the season with 1099 runs at 45.79.

The 1951–52 season was less productive, with the West Indies touring Australia. Playing in all five Tests, Harvey scored 261 runs at 26.10 with one half century as Australia won 4–1. Harvey had difficulties in dealing with the dual spin bowling combination of Alf Valentine and Sonny Ramadhin, who bowled left arm orthodox and leg spin respectively and accounted for him six times in the Tests. His only fifty was an 83 in the first innings of the Fourth Test in Melbourne. Australia went on to complete a dramatic one-wicket victory. Harvey had a poor season overall, scoring only 551 first-class runs at 32.41 without managing a single century.

== Peak years ==
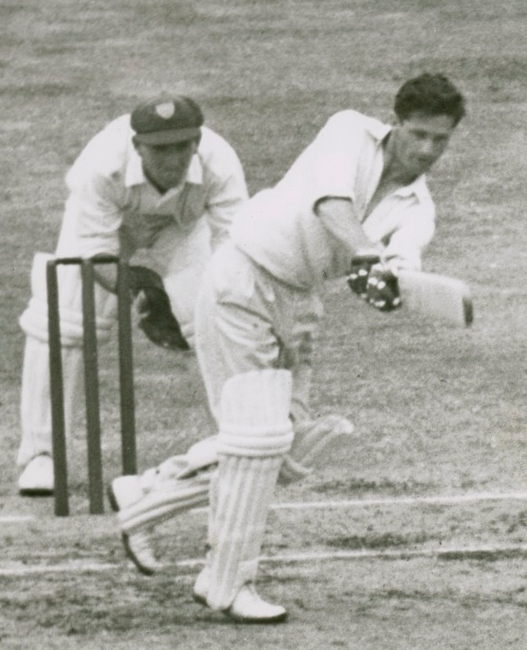
Harvey batting in 1952

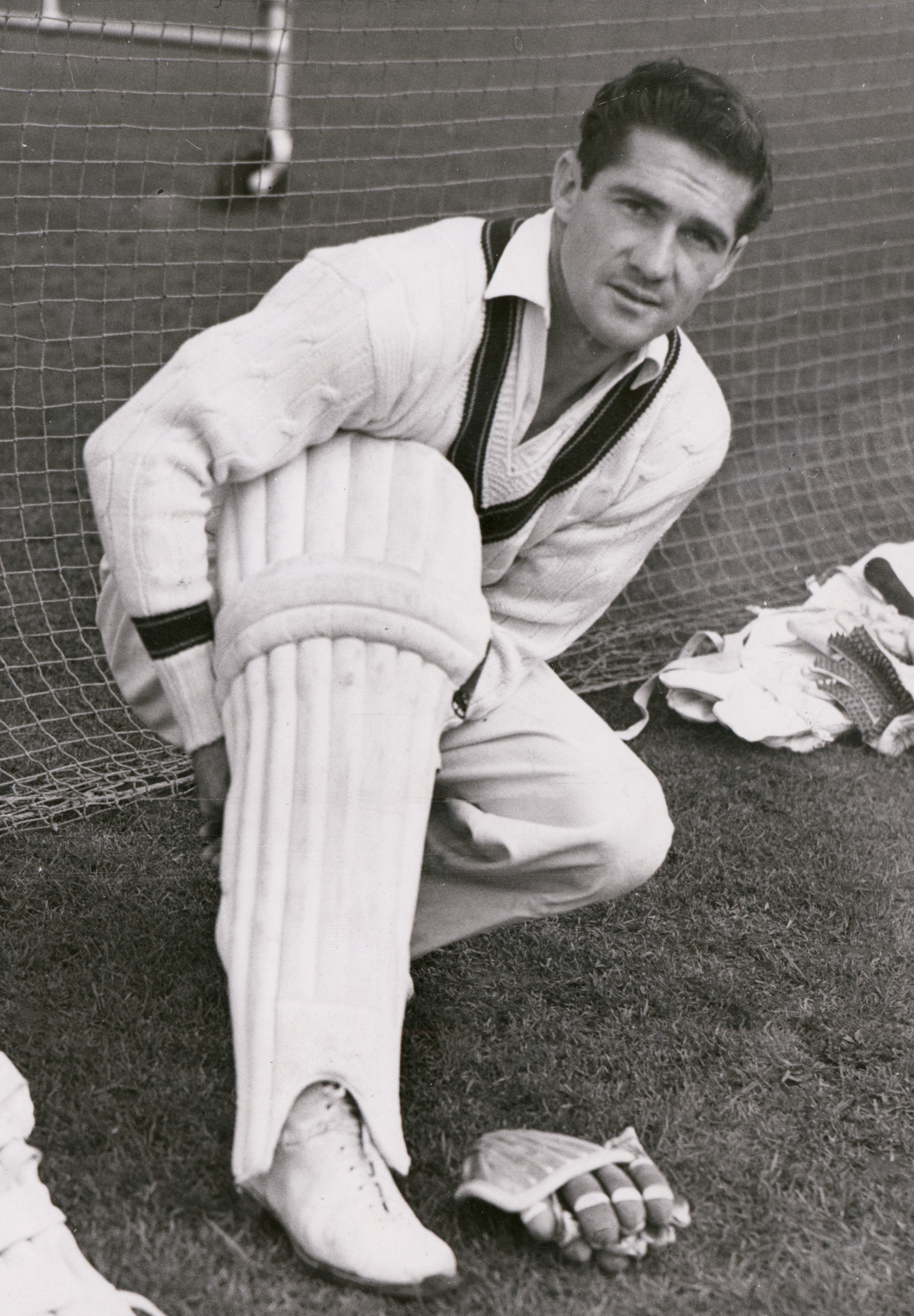
Harvey at Lord's in 1953

Harvey started the 1952–53 season without a first-class century in more than 18 months and in three matches ahead of the Tests, suffered two defeats and was yet to break his drought.

Having failed to score a century in ten Tests and almost three years, the season saw Harvey at his productive best as South Africa, whom he had scored four centuries against three years earlier, toured Australia. On a slow pitch difficult for stroke play, Harvey scored 109 and 52 in Brisbane where Australia grounded out a victory in the First Test. He top-scored in the first innings and was the second top-score (run out) in the second.

Such was his performance in the series that his scores of 11 and 60 in the Second Test, top-scoring in the second innings, were his worst, as Australia lost their first Test to South Africa for 42 years.

Harvey then top-scored with 190 in the Third Test in Sydney to set up a large first innings lead of 270 and an innings victory. Harvey alone made more than his opponents in the first innings and the innings saw him complete 1000 Test runs against the South Africans in only eight Tests. Harvey made it consecutive centuries in as many matches, with 84 and 116 in Adelaide. Starting with an on-driven boundary off the first ball of the last day's play, Harvey's century took 106 minutes and was the fastest record in the Australia since World War II and the sixth fastest of all time in Australia. With leading pacemen Ray Lindwall and Keith Miller breaking down in the match, Harvey bowled for only the third time in his Test career. He took his first of three wickets at Test level, that of Russell Endean as a depleted Australian attack could not defeat the visitors who finished seven wickets down.

As the series 2–1 in Australia's favour and not yet won, the Fifth Test in Melbourne was a timeless Test. Harvey compiled his third consecutive century and highest Test score of 205 as Australia amassed 520 in the first innings. This put Australia in control of the Test, despite South Africa successfully chasing an unlikely target of 295. Harvey accumulated 834 Test runs at 92.66 in the series. This surpassed Bradman's aggregate of 806 runs in 1931–32 as a series record against South Africa. In ten Tests against South Africa, he had eight centuries, totalling 1494 runs at an average of 106.71.

Harvey totalled 1,659 runs at 63.81 for the season, the second highest tally for a season in Australian history, just 31 runs behind Bradman's record. In the last four matches of the season, he scored 95, 148, 49, 81 and 48 to come within striking distance. In the last match of the season, Western Australian captain Wally Langdon declared early on the last afternoon to allow Harvey another innings so he could break the record. However, Harvey muttered "I wouldn't want to break a record that way" and managed only 13.

In 1953 Harvey became only the third Australian in a quarter of a century to score 2,000 runs on an Ashes tour. Bradman (three times) and Stan McCabe were the others. He made 2,040 at 65.80 and his ten centuries were twice that of the next best in the side.

Harvey started the first-class campaign with an unbeaten 202 against Leicestershire, setting up an innings victory. After reaching 25 in each of the next four innings without converting any starts into a score beyond 66, Harvey rectified this in the two weeks before the Tests started.

Harvey struck 109 against the Minor Counties, 103 against Lancashire, 82 and 137 not out against Sussex and 109 against Hampshire. His 109 against Minor Counties was only nine less than the entire opposition managed in two innings, and he had scored 540 runs in four completed innings in 14 days.

Harvey was not at his best in the five Tests. In the 11 innings leading up to the Tests, Harvey's lowest score was 14, and he had only failed to pass 30 twice. However, in the First Test at Trent Bridge, Harvey had a duck and two and falling twice to Bedser as Australia hung on for a draw in a rain-affected contest. After scoring 69 against Yorkshire, Harvey made 59 and 21 in the Second Test at Lord's, again falling to Bedser in both innings. Some tenacious batting in the second innings saw the hosts save the match with three wickets in hand.

Harvey returned to form by striking 141 against Gloucestershire before taking 3/9, his first three-wicket haul at first-class level, to help Australia take a nine-wicket win. He added a second century in as many innings with 118 in an innings win over Northamptonshire. Harvey then struck 122 in the rain affected Third Test at Manchester; he helped Australia take a 42-run first innings lead, but was out for a duck in the second innings. Australia collapsed to 8/35 and were saved from defeat by the rain, which meant that less than 14 hours of play was possible.

Harvey then returned to Headingley, the venue of his famous innings five years earlier. In a low-scoring match, he top-scored for the entire match with 71 in the first innings as Australia took a 99-run lead. The tourists looked set for victory and retention of The Ashes at the start of the final day, but time-wasting and defiant defence from the English batsmen left Australia a target of 177 in the last two hours. This would have required a scoring rate much higher than in the first four days of the match. Harvey quickly scored 34 at a run a minute, and Australia had made 111 in 75 minutes and were on schedule for a win. At that point, English medium-pacer Trevor Bailey began bowling with the wicket-keeper more than two metres down the leg side to deny the Australians an opportunity to hit the ball, but the umpires did not penalise them as wides. The match ended in a draw, and Harvey described Bailey's tactics as "absolutely disgusting". English wicket-keeper Godfrey Evans said that the tourists "were absolutely livid" and he sympathised with them, saying that "they were right" in claiming that Bailey's bowling was "the worst kind of negative cricket" and that he had "cheated [them] of victory".

With the series locked at 0–0, the fate of The Ashes would be determined in the Fifth and final Test at The Oval. In the lead-up, Harvey scored 113 and 180 in consecutive innings against Surrey and Glamorgan, before failing to pass single figures in his next three innings before the deciding match.

Harvey made 36 as Australia made 275 batting first. England then took a 31-run lead and Harvey was out for only one in the second innings as the hosts won the Ashes 1–0 after 19 years in Australian hands. Harvey scored 346 runs at 34.60 for the series; in a low-scoring series, this placed him second behind captain Lindsay Hassett (365 runs at 36.50). Harvey failed to pass 41 in the four first-class matches remaining after the Tests. With the retirement of Hassett at the end of the season, Harvey was to bear more responsibility in the batting line-up. In recognition of his performances during the summer, during which he scored 2040 runs at 65.40, he was named as one of the Wisden Cricketers of the Year. The next highest Australian aggregate and average was 1433 at 51.17 by Miller, and the second most prolific centurymaker was Hassett with five.

Harvey returned to Australia and played in the 1953–54 season, which was purely domestic. He scored 639 runs at 42.60, including a century against New South Wales and four fifties. He had a few near-misses during the season; he scored 97 against Queensland in two matches and made 88 against South Australia.

The 1954–55 season saw England tour Australia, and Harvey scored 98 in three innings in warm-up matches against the visitors. He struck 162 in the First Test in Brisbane after Australia were sent in, helping to compile 8/601 to set up an innings victory. Between Tests, he scored 59 and 34 not out for Victoria against the Englishmen.

This was followed by a low scoring Second Test in Sydney when Australia were 4/77 needing 223 to win on a poor wicket against the lethal pace of Frank Tyson and Brian Statham. The express Tyson was bowling with the help of tailwind and the slips cordon were over 50 m behind the bat. Harvey stood firm while Tyson scattered the stumps of his partners, and he farmed the strike ruthlessly, protecting the tailenders and counter-attacking the England fast bowlers, relying on the cut shot and clipping anything on his pads through the leg side. Schoolboys watching the game leaned over the fence to beckon the boundaries towards them. Last man Bill Johnston came in at 9/145 with 78 runs still required, but protected by Harvey he only had to face 16 balls in 40 minutes and they almost produced an unlikely Australian victory. Harvey continued to attack the bowling, and he hooked Tyson over fine leg's head for four. Together, Harvey and Johnston they had added 39 for the last wicket and halved the runs required. At this point, the Australian pair were confident. Harvey and Johnston felt that Tyson was about to run out of energy, and that their prospects would improve when Hutton would have been forced to change bowlers in the near future. However, it was not enough and England won by 38 runs when Johnston gloved a Tyson delivery down the leg side to the wicket-keeper. Harvey had played what many observers thought was the greatest innings of his life, a defiant, unbeaten 92, exactly half of the Australian innings of 184 in which no other batsmen reached 15.

From there on, Harvey's series was unproductive, failing to pass 31 in the six innings of the final three Tests. Australia's form slumped along with that of Harvey, losing the next two Tests and the series 3–1. Harvey ended with 354 runs at 44.25 for the series. Despite this, he continued to productive in the other first-class matches and was by far the most productive batsman in the 1954–55 Australian season, accumulating 1100 at 47.83 runs ahead of Les Favell's 663. He scored a pair of 62s in a 36-run win over New South Wales, 95 and 66 against Queensland and 82 and 47 in a match for a Tasmania Combined XI against England.

This was followed by a tour in early 1955 to the West Indies, the first by an Australian team. Harvey began with two consecutive centuries, scoring exactly 133 in both the First and Second Tests at Kingston and Port-of-Spain respectively. The matches ended in an innings victory and draw to Australia respectively. In a low scoring match in Georgetown, Harvey scored 38 and 41* as Australia took a 2–0 lead. Another half century in the drawn Fourth Test followed, before Harvey scored the second double century of his career, 204 in the Fifth Test in Kingston in just over seven hours of batting. His 295 run partnership with Colin McDonald was the foundation of a Test total of 8/758, setting up an innings victory for Australia. He totalled 650 runs at 108.33 for the series. For the entire tour, he scored 789 runs at 71.73. After the tour Arthur Morris retired, leaving Harvey as the most experienced batsman of the team. Harvey had also expunged his demons that he experienced against Ramadhin and Valentine in the previous series. Of the spin duo, only Ramadhin was able to dismiss Harvey on one occasion.

The 1955–56 Australian summer was another purely domestic season. Harvey had a successful campaign with 772 runs 55.14. He struck 128 and 76 against a New South Wales team composed mainly of Test players, but Victoria's arch-rivals hung on for a draw with three wickets in hand. He added two further centuries and a 96, and all of these innings came in the span of a month in which he amassed 612 runs.

== Struggles in 1956 ==
The 1956 Ashes tour to England was a disappointment for Harvey individually as well for the Australians collectively. It was an English summer dominated by off spinner Jim Laker and his Surrey teammate Tony Lock, who repeatedly dismantled the tourists on dusty spinning pitches specifically tailored to their cater for them.

The tour started poorly for Harvey. In five innings in the first three weeks, he scored only 36 runs at 7.20, and this included a ten-wicket defeat at the hands of Laker and Lock's Surrey. It was Australia's first loss to a county side since 1912. Harvey began to run into some form after that, scoring 45 against Cambridge University before the match against the Marylebone Cricket Club (MCC), which fielded a virtual England Test team in what was effectively a dress rehearsal for the Tests. Harvey made 225 in Australia's 413 and the hosts made 9/203 to draw the match. However, he was unable to replicate this form in the Tests.

In the First Test at Nottingham, Harvey scored 64 and three in a rain-affected draw. He then made a duck and ten as Australia took the series lead in the Second Test at Lord's. Despite Australia's success, Harvey was having an extended run-drought; he had made only 23 runs in three weeks.

Then came the two Australian capitulations against Laker and Lock in the Tests. Harvey made 11 as Australia were bowled out for 143 and forced to follow on in the Third Test played on a turning pitch at Headingley. He then contributed 69 of 140 in the second innings of the Third Test at Headingley, when the rest of the team struggled to deal with Laker and Lock, who spun England to an innings victory. It was the first time Australia had suffered an innings defeat in a Test since 1938. However, Harvey was unable to repeat his defiant form over the next three weeks. The Fourth Test in Manchester was the low point, when Harvey managed a pair, falling both times to Laker, who took a world record 19 wickets. Australia were routed by an innings in what is known as "Laker's match" to concede the Ashes 2–1. The debacle at Old Trafford was part of a three-week trough during which Harvey scored only 11 runs, including three consecutive ducks in a 17-day period that yielded not a solitary run.

Harvey then returned to productivity with 145 against Warwickshire and added a further half-century in the remaining matches. He also took 5/57 in an innings to help set up a seven-wicket win over the Minor Counties, although the match was not first-class. Harvey compiled 197 runs at 19.70 in five Tests with two half centuries. It was by far his most unproductive summer in England, with 976 runs at 31.48. Such was the dominance of the Laker-Lock-led attack that Harvey was Australia's fifth-highest runscorer in the Tests and fourth in the first-class matches.

On the return to Australia, the team stopped on the Indian subcontinent to play their first Tests on Pakistani and Indian soil respectively. In a short tour, the four Tests were the only fixtures. Harvey failed to pass double figures in a one-off Test against Pakistan in Karachi, the first between the two countries. Moving to India, he scored 140 in the drawn Second Test in Bombay, scoring runs all around the ground. Due to injuries and illness to many of the bowlers, the Australians were unable to dismiss their hosts twice. In the final match, Australia were in trouble after taking a 41-run first innings lead. In the second innings they were struggling on a sticky wicket caused by flooding, but made 69 out of 9/189 in the low-scoring Third Test in Calcutta to help Australia to a 2–0 series win. He ended with 253 runs at 63.25 for the series. His performances on the subcontinent were marked by his aggressive footwork in moving down to meet the pitch of the ball. After seven months away, the Australians returned home.

== Senior player and vice captaincy ==
As expected, the Australian team's leaders Ian Johnson and Keith Miller, retired from cricket after the tour. Harvey replaced Johnson as Victorian captain and was the logical choice as successor to the Test captaincy, as the most experienced member of the team (48 Tests). Queensland's captain, the veteran paceman Ray Lindwall, was no longer an automatic Test selection. However, both Harvey and Benaud had been criticised for their attitude towards Johnson in an official report to the board about the 1956 tour. Harvey was surprisingly overlooked for the captaincy, which went to Ian Craig, who had replaced Miller as New South Wales skipper. Craig was only 22 and had played six Tests; he had yet to establish himself in the team. After several disappointing results against England, the selectors chose a youthful team. Harvey was named vice-captain to Craig for both the 1956–57 non-Test tour of New Zealand and the 1957–58 Test tour to South Africa.

Australia's two new leaders featured in a dramatic game during the season—the first tied match in Sheffield Shield history, played at the Junction Oval in Melbourne. New South Wales, chasing 161 to win, slumped to 7/70 when Craig (suffering tonsillitis) defied medical orders, left his hospital bed, and came out to bat. A partnership of 75 with Richie Benaud took them to within 16 runs of victory, but another collapse left the scores tied.

The day after the captaincy announcement, the Harvey-led Victorians met Craig's New South Welshmen at the SCG in the last match of the Shield season. Harvey admitted to being irked by the board's snub and felt that it was because of his blunt nature. The men were cordial at the toss and Craig sent the Victorians in to bat. At the same time, Victorian batsman Colin McDonald hit a ball into his face and broke his nose while practising, as Harvey and Craig went out to toss. Harvey asked for a gentleman's agreement to allow a substitute for McDonald. Craig refused, citing the importance of the match. This evoked a rare angry response from Harvey, according to Benaud. Playing with ten men, Benaud said that Harvey "proceeded, with a certain amount of anger, to play one of the best innings I have seen in Sheffield Shield". He made 209 and later forced New South Wales to follow-on. In the end the match was drawn and Harvey was unable to deny New South Wales the title. Harvey said that his first double century for Victoria "gave me as much pleasure as any innings I had ever played". He finished his only season as Victorian captain by leading the Shield averages with 836 runs at 104.50.

His other substantial scores were 108 (more than half the team total) and 53 in an innings loss to Queensland, 125 and 66 not out in a win over against South Australia and 115 in the return match against Queensland. In a selection trial, he led Harvey's XI to a seven-wicket win over Lindwall's XI, scoring 31 and 61 not out.

The New Zealand tour was regarded as a test of Craig as a leader. Wicket-keeper Barry Jarman said that Craig "had to do it himself...I wasn't so dumb that I couldn't see the senior players didn't give him much support". The senior players resented his surprise selection as captain, but he gained favour by defying a management-imposed curfew, which was later scrapped.

Harvey was unable to maintain his form from the Australian season after crossing the Tasman to face the New Zealanders. He scored 129 runs at 25.80, including an 84, as Australia won the third and final match to take the series 1–0. Outside the international matches, Harvey was productive, and he totalled 460 runs at 46.00 for the tour.

Some players remained resentful of Craig's dubious elevation ahead of Harvey during the 1957–58 tour of South Africa but appreciated that he had not promoted himself and that he was fair and open to input from teammates. On the tour, Harvey broke a finger at catching practice and missed the early tour matches. After it healed, Harvey returned for a match against a South African XI, in a virtual dress rehearsal for the Tests. He scored 173 as the tourists crushed their hosts by an innings.

However, Harvey broke the same finger again and missed the First Test, ending a run of 48 consecutive Test matches. He returned for the remaining Tests and scored 68 in the Third Test to help to force a draw, after Australia had conceded a 221-run first innings lead, but apart from that he had a disappointing series, failing to pass 25 and finishing with 131 runs at 21.83.

Despite the disagreement as to whether Craig was deserving of the captaincy, the team proceeded smoothly without infighting. Prior to the Fifth Test, Craig wanted to drop himself due to poor form, which would have made Harvey captain. Peter Burge, the third member of the selection panel and a Harvey supporter, was comfortable with this, but Harvey relinquished his opportunity to seize the leadership by ordering Burge to retain Craig. When the vote was formally taken, Harvey and Burge outvoted Craig, who was still offering to drop himself.

The Tests aside, Harvey continued to score regularly in the other games, and ended with 759 first-class runs at 50.60, with two centuries and five fifties. The team under Craig and Harvey, labelled the worst to leave Australian shores, went home 3–0 victors in the five Test series.

== Move to New South Wales and non-captaincy ==
After returning from South Africa, Harvey embarrassed the Board of Control when he frankly discussed his financial situation during a television interview. He revealed that the players earned only £85 per Test and that he was almost broke, despite being an automatic selection for Australia. Ten years of making time for cricket had disrupted his working life, so he was contemplating a move to South Africa, the homeland of his wife, Iris. Consequently, Harvey received a job offer to work as a sales supervisor for a glass manufacturer in Sydney, so he moved to New South Wales and gave up the Victorian captaincy. As a new player to NSW, he was behind vice-captain Richie Benaud in the state's pecking order, despite being the Test vice-captain, ahead of Benaud. Fatefully, Craig was unfit for the start of the 1958–59 season, due to the after-effects of hepatitis.

This left the Australian captaincy open again. Harvey started the season strongly and scored 326 runs in his first three innings. This included 160 against Queensland and 149 for his new state against the touring England team of Peter May. In this match, Benaud had captained New South Wales and the hosts had the better of the play. They took a 214-run first innings lead and May's men when 6/356 when time ran out.

Harvey was appointed to captain an Australian XI in a warm-up match against the touring Englishmen, indicating that the selectors were considering him for the Test captaincy. Harvey scored a duck and 38 and the Australians lost heavily by 345 runs on a wicket with a crater. Therefore, Benaud was made Australian captain ahead of Harvey.

As Benaud's deputy, Harvey helped materially in Australia's surprise 4–0 series victory to reclaim the Ashes. Harvey's form was modest, though. He scored 296 runs at 42.29, with more than half coming in one innings—a brilliant 167 in the Second Test at Melbourne, more than half his team's 308, which helped secure an eight wicket victory in the match. Otherwise, a 41 in the Fourth Test was the only other time he passed 25 in the series. Outside the Tests, he scored 92 in the second match of the season between New South Wales and England, and ended the season with 949 runs at 49.95. It was season of two-halves; in the latter two months, he scored only 339 runs.

During the 1959–60 season, Australian undertook an arduous tour of the subcontinent, with three and five Tests against Pakistan and India, respectively. Prior to the trip, Harvey made 112 in the second innings to help Lindwall's XI defeat Benaud's XI by seven wickets.

In Dhaka, East Pakistan (now in Bangladesh), Harvey made 96 on a matting pitch over rough ground in the First Test, mastering the medium pace of Fazal Mahmood, while his teammates struggled to score. In the course of the innings, Harvey had to overcome a fever, dysentery and physical illness, which forced him to leave six times to recompose himself. Gideon Haigh called it "one of his most dazzling innings". Described by Benaud as "one of the best innings at Test level", it set up an Australian win. During his stay at the crease, his partners contributed 48 runs while seven wickets fell. Harvey's innings allowed Australia to score 225 in reply to the hosts' 200. Harvey then made 30 in the second innings to help ensure an eight-wicket win.

After scoring 43 in the first innings, the second Test in Lahore came down to a run-chase for Australia, with Harvey and Norm O'Neill seemingly on schedule to win before time ran out. However, the Pakistani fielders began to waste time in an attempt to foil an Australian victory. They swapped the cover and midwicket fielders very slowly whenever the left and right-handed combination of Harvey and O'Neill took a single and changed the batsman on strike. To counter this, Harvey deliberately backed away from a straight ball and let himself be bowled, throwing his wicket away for 37. This allowed Benaud to come in and bat with O'Neill so that the two right-handed batsmen would give the Pakistanis no opportunity to waste time by switching the field. Australia won the match with minutes to spare. Harvey scored 54 and 13 not out in the drawn third Test at Karachi. Australia took the series 2–0, but would not win another Test in Pakistan until 1998. Harvey ended the series with 273 runs at 54.60.

In India, Harvey scored 114 out of Australia's 468 in the First Test at Delhi, setting up an innings victory for Australia. On a pitch conducive to spin at Kanpur for the second Test, Harvey was given a rare opportunity to bowl and he took the wicket of the Indian captain, Gulabrai Ramchand. In addition, he scored 51 and 25, the second highest Australian score in each innings in a low-scoring match, but India won to square the series, with off spinner Jasu Patel taking 14/124. Harvey hit 102 in a drawn third Test in Bombay and took his third (and final) Test wicket, A. G. Milkha Singh, in the fourth Test at Madras. He ended the series with 356 runs at 50.86, a significant contribution to Australia's 2–1 triumph.

== International twilight ==
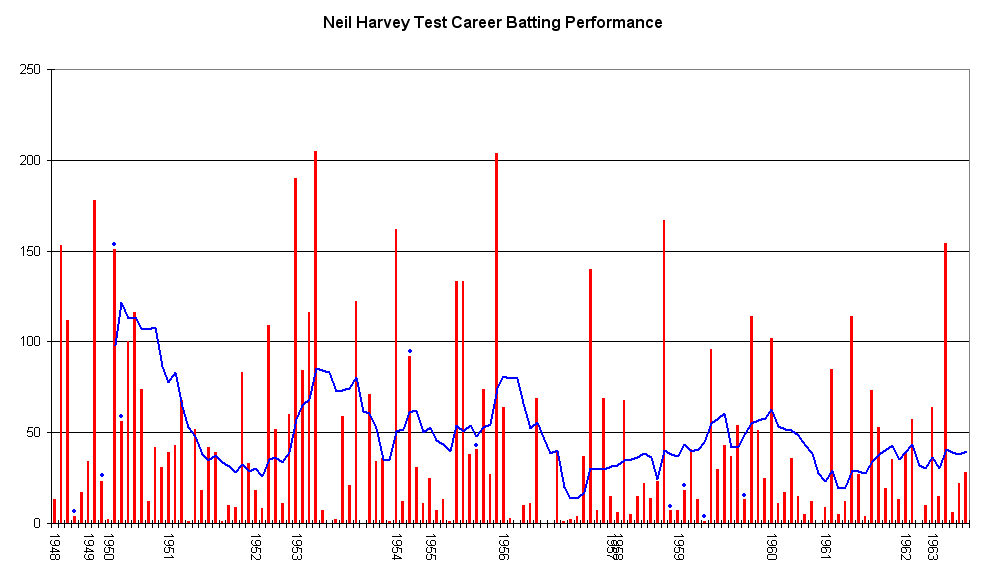
Neil Harvey's Test career batting performance. The red bars indicate the runs that he scored in an innings, with the blue line indicating the batting average in his last ten innings. The blue dots indicate an innings where he remained not out.

In the last years of his Test career, Harvey struggled, making 876 runs at 33.69 in three Test series.

At the start of the 1960–61 season, there was little indication of this. In his first five innings for the summer, Harvey hit 135 against Queensland, 80 and 63 for an Australian XI against the touring West Indies, 229 against Queensland and 109 for New South Wales against the Caribbean team. However, his form tapered away during the thrilling 1960–61 home series against the West Indies (which included the first tie in Test history). Harvey was ineffective apart from a score of 85 in the second innings of the Third Test, which Australia lost. He then missed the Fourth Test due to injury. He struggled in the Tests, scoring only 143 runs at 17.88, but prospered against the Caribbean tourists in the tour matches, scoring 326 runs at 81.50. Overall, he totalled 849 runs at 56.60 for the season.

Harvey began his final tour to England in 1961, and Benaud's regular absences due to a shoulder injury allowed him to lead Australia for a third of the tour matches. This included most of the first month of the tour; Benaud hurt his shoulder in the first match against Worcestershire, and spent most of the next three weeks either not bowling or travelling to London away from his men for specialist treatment. At one stage, Australia were left with only 10 men on the field when Benaud excused himself and his replacement succumbed to illness, requiring an Englishman to stand in. Harvey scored 474 runs at 47.40 in eight matches leading up to the Tests, including centuries against Lancashire and Glamorgan. It seemed that Harvey would captain Australia in a Test for the first time with Benaud's shoulder still problematic, but the captain declared himself fit. Harvey then made 114 in the drawn First Test at Edgbaston. This helped Australia take a 321-run first innings lead and put them in control of the match, but the hosts batted for the remainder of the match to stave off defeat; Benaud's shoulder prevented him from bowling more than nine overs.

The injury forced Benaud out of the next Test, meaning that Harvey finally captained Australia at the highest level, in the Second Test at Lord's, with Davidson carrying an injury and wicketkeeper Wally Grout with a black eye. This meant that Australia's two best bowlers were injured, although Davidson agreed to play. Played on a controversial pitch with a noticeable ridge running across it, which caused irregular bounce, it was one of the great Test matches, known as "The Battle of the Ridge". Davidson took 5/42 and bruised many of the English batsmen with the irregular bounce as the hosts were bowled out for 205. Australia then replied with 339, in large part due to Bill Lawry's 130, during which he sustained many blows. In the second innings, Harvey's captaincy moves proved to be highly productive. He gave the new ball to Graham McKenzie, a young paceman playing in his first international series. McKenzie responded by taking 5/37. Harvey brought the part-time leg spin of Bob Simpson into the attack when Ray Illingworth had just arrived at the crease, and moved himself into the leg slip position. Illingworth edged Simpson into Harvey's hands for a duck. England fell for 202, leaving Australia a target of 69.

However, victory appeared to be far from certain when Australia slumped to 4/19 on the erratic surface. Harvey sent Peter Burge out to attack the bowling, a tactic that worked as Australia won by five wickets. Burge hit the winning runs after earlier being dropped. The "Battle of the Ridge" was the only time Harvey captained Australia in a Test match. Despite the win, Harvey was not prominent in terms of his individual contribution, scoring 27 and four. Harvey described the win as "propbably my proudest moment. We really got on the French champagne that afternoon. I knew it'd be my only Test match as captain and, being at Lord's, I decided to make the best of it."

Benaud returned for the Third Test, when England levelled the series despite twin half-centuries of 73 and 53 from Harvey, who top-scored in both innings on a dustbowl in a match that lasted only three days. Harvey failed to pass 35 in the last two Tests, and ended with 338 runs at 42.25, and was a significant factor in Australia's eventual 2–1 victory. In the second half of the tour, Harvey added centuries against Nottinghamshire and Warwickshire and took his career best bowling fugres of 4/8 against Middlesex to help set up a ten-wicket win. He ended his final tour for Australia with 1452 runs at 44.00 with five centuries. During the season, Harvey and Benaud led aggressively to force a result through attacking strategy and a determination to avoid time-wasting.

The 1961–62 was purely domestic, and Harvey played a full season in the Sheffield Shield as New South Wales won their ninth consecutive title. However, Harvey was not prominent in the team's success and scored only 425 runs at 26.56 with two fifties for the season.

Having stated his intention to retire at the end of the summer, Harvey started his final season in 1962–63 strongly. He scored 83, 44 and 128 not in his first three interstate innings for the season, and then scored 51, 21 and 63 in warm-up matches against England.

Harvey was thus selected in the series against England, his last in international cricket. During the season, Harvey applied to the Australian Cricket Board for permission to work as a journalist while also playing cricket. The application was refused, but Harvey wrote some bitter criticism of England captain Ted Dexter at the end of the series. Following a complaint from the Marylebone Cricket Club, the ACB said that it deplored Harvey's comments. Beginning steadily with half-centuries in the first and third Tests, Harvey made his 21st and final century in the fourth Test at Adelaide. Scoring 154 in a drawn match at the venue where his international career began 15 seasons earlier, Harvey then returned to his adopted hometown of Sydney for his farewell match. With the series level at 1–1, the Ashes were still alive but the game turned into a dull draw and Harvey scored 22 and 28. He was bowled by David Allen in the final innings. In the two English innings, he held six catches to equal the world record, a reminder of his prowess as one of Australia's great all-round fielders. Harvey retired as Australia's most capped player, and a tally of runs and centuries second only to Don Bradman.

Harvey made centuries in two of his last three first-class matches. In his last Sheffield Shield match, he scored an unbeaten 231 against South Australia in less than five hours, including 120 runs in one session. This set up a ten-wicket victory. In his final season, Harvey scored 1110 runs at 52.85.

== Style ==
Harvey was regarded as a mercurial batsman of great artistry and style. A short man at 172 cm (5 ft 8 in), he batted with aggression, and was known for his timing of the ball. His batting against spin bowling in particular was a crowd-pleaser, highlighted by his extravagant footwork in charging the bowlers. Harvey often charged five paces down the pitch to spinners, with one bowler quipping: "He kept coming so far along the track toward me that I thought he must want to shake my hands". Despite running out of the crease so much, Harvey was never stumped in a Test match. He was of the belief that any bowling could and should be hit, and he gave the impression that the balls were reaching the boundary with a minimum of power. According to Johnnie Moyes, "the sight of his slim figure, neat and trim-looking, always capless, coming to bat brought new hope for spectators. He will never prod a half volley or decline the challenge of a long hop...he will go looking for the ball which he can hit for four." Following the retirement of Sir Donald Bradman, he was seen as Australia's leading batsman, noted by critics for a similar ability to change the mood of matches with his attacking play. Ashley Mallett said that Harvey was Australia's best batsman since Bradman. This was despite the fact that he was found to have faulty eyesight. With the global expansion of cricket, Harvey was the first Australian to make Test centuries in 15 different cities, succeeding in a variety of conditions. Harvey made 67 first-class centuries spread across 35 venues in six countries. He scored 38 of these overseas, where his average was higher. He was the first batsman to score more than 10,000 runs for Australian teams at home and abroad.

Harvey's attacking style often led to criticism that his batting was risky, with England captain Len Hutton feeling that he played and missed too much, while dour all-rounder Trevor Bailey quipped: "I wonder how many runs Harvey would make if he decided to stop playing strokes with an element of risk about them". Harvey was nevertheless happy to continue his flamboyant strokeplay. However, as Harvey progressed in seniority, he eschewed his hook shot and played more conservatively for his team's sake. He typically evaded bouncers by tilting his head, rather than ducking the ball.

Although Harvey started as a wicketkeeper at school, he became a highly regarded cover fielder and later in his international career became an agile slips catcher. He bowled off spin from a three- to four-pace approach on rare occasions, taking only three wickets in his Test career. Away from the field, Harvey had a quiet and unassuming manner, in complete contrast to his dynamic batting, and his aversion to smoking and drinking set him apart from the prevailing cricket culture of his period. Harvey was known for his respect for umpiring decisions and for never appealing for leg before wicket when he fielded in the slips.

When not travelling overseas on cricket tours, Harvey played baseball in the winter for the Fitzroy Baseball Club. He was twice named in the Australian baseball team, but the team was named only for the distinction accorded on the players; that is, they never competed. Harvey's fielding abilities were regarded by Wisden as the "finest outfielder in the world" during his career. As a baseball infielder, Harvey developed a half round-arm throw; its speed and accuracy caused many batsmen to be run out while attempting a run. Ray Robinson said that Harvey's throw was "arrow-like" in accuracy and that "as a versatile fieldsman, this ball-hawk...takes top place". His baseball training also influenced his habit of catching the ball above head height, with which he rarely dropped catches. This was based on the theory that the fielder need never take his eyes off the ball and, if it were to bounce out of his hands, he would have time to attempt to grab the rebound. Harvey also covered ground quickly and possessed an efficient method of picking up and returning the ball. From late 1958 when Norm O'Neill made his Test debut until Harvey's retirement in 1963, the duo formed a formidable pairing in the covers, helping to restrict opposition batsmen from scoring in the region.

== Later years ==
Harvey was an Australian selector from 1967 to 1979. Immediately after his appointment, he was embroiled in controversy during the First Test against India at Brisbane in 1967–68. The Queensland Cricket Association wrote to the board, complaining that Harvey, who was the selector on duty at the Test, had missed two hours of play. He had been at a race meeting at the invitation of the QCA president. The ACB gave Harvey a talking to. Despite this, he retained his position at the next annual election, with Queensland's Ken Mackay failing to gain a seat on the selection panel.

From 1971 onwards, Harvey was the chairman of selectors. It was a tumultuous period in Australian cricket, where captain Bill Lawry was acrimoniously sacked in the middle of the 1970–71 series against England after a dispute between players and Australian officials. Lawry was not informed of his fate and learned of his omission on the radio when he was still one of Australia's most productive batsmen. The dispute was the genesis of the pay dispute which, led to the formation of World Series Cricket in 1977 and generated a mass exodus of players. This resulted in the recall of Bob Simpson after ten years in retirement at the age of 41 to captain the Test team. Following the rapprochement between the establishment and the WSC players, Harvey left the selection panel. The WSC representatives felt that Harvey's anti-WSC comments made him prejudiced against the selection of former WSC players.

After returning from South Africa in 1950, Harvey was offered a job in captain Lindsay Hassett's sports store. Harvey accepted immediately because sports stores gave more flexible arrangements for leave to play cricket. Harvey was sponsored by Stuart Surridge to use their cricket equipment. He was paid £300 a year, but nevertheless lived at home and shared a bedroom with his brothers Brian and Ray until he married, due to poverty. He used the same cricket uniforms for more than five years.

Harvey's career extended into a successful business, Har-V-Sales, which distributed tupperware, kitchen and cosmetic products.

In later life, he was known for his blunt and critical comments towards modern players, believing the cricket in earlier times to be superior. After Steve Waugh's team set a world record of consecutive Test victories, Harvey named three Australian teams that he thought to be superiors, saying "no, far from it" in response to the suggestion that Waugh's men were the best team in history. He attributed the wins to weak opponents, stating "No I don't think they're up to the world standard they were years ago" and that the 1980s West Indies team were far superior. He also criticised the Australian team for publicly praising the skills of their opponents, believing that they did so to aggrandise their statistical performances against teams he considered to be weak. In 2000, he was named in the Australian Cricket Board's Team of the Century and criticised modern-day batsmen, noting that players in earlier eras had to play on sticky wickets, saying: "these guys who play out here are a little bit spoilt in my opinion. They play on flat wickets all the time and they grizzle if ... the ball does a little bit off the pitch, and whatever ... But we had to put up with that" and going to assert his opinion that the current players would be no match.

Harvey was inducted into the Australian Cricket Hall of Fame in 2000, in the first annual induction of two players since the inaugural ten members were announced in 1996. In 2009, Harvey was one of the 55 inaugural inductees into the ICC Cricket Hall of Fame. He was also inducted into the Sport Australia Hall of Fame in 1985. Harvey vociferously called for Shane Warne and Mark Waugh to be banned from cricket after it was revealed that they accepted money from bookmakers to give pitch and weather information and the ACB privately fined them. He lamented the decline in player conduct in the modern era, also criticising the modern advent of sledging.

In 2002, Harvey called for Mark and Steve Waugh to be dropped from the Australian team, claiming that they were a waste of space. He stated:

Money is the only thing that keeps them playing...If they earned the same money as I did when I was playing they'd have retired at 34 as I did, and Australian cricket would be the better for it.

When Waugh was close to being dropped during the 2002–03 series against England, Harvey wrote off a half-century made by Waugh, saying "he's playing against probably one of the worst cricket teams I've ever seen."

Following the death of Arthur Morris on 22 August 2015, Harvey became the last surviving member of the Invincibles who toured England in 1948.

Harvey received the Medal of the Order of Australia in the Queen's 2018 Birthday Honours (Australia) for service to cricket.

Following the death of South Africa's Ronald Draper on 25 February 2025, Harvey became the oldest living Test cricketer.

== Personal life ==
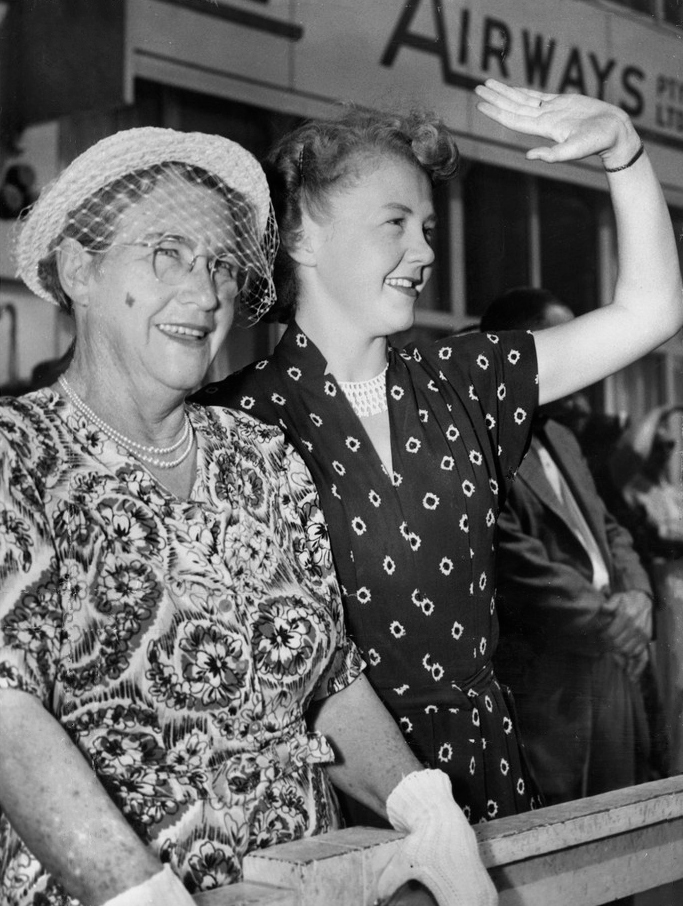
Harvey's mother and fiancée, Iris Greenish, in 1953

During the 1949–50 tour of South Africa, Harvey met his first wife Iris Greenish. At the time, Greenish was only 16 years old and Harvey 21, and their relationship became the subject of controversy when her father told the media that he would object to the couple's engagement until his daughter turned 18. They married four years later at Holy Trinity Church in East Melbourne and had three children: two sons and a daughter. Harvey's second wife, Barbara, died in 2014.

== Test match performance ==
		Batting				Bowling		
Opposition	Matches	Runs	Average	High score	100s/50s	Wickets	Average	Best bowling (innings)
England	37	2,416	38.34	167	6/12	0	–	–
India	10	775	59.63	153	4/2	2	29.50	1/8
Pakistan	4	279	39.85	96	0/2	0	–	–
South Africa	14	1,625	81.25	205	8/5	1	20.00	1/9
West Indies	14	1,054	43.91	204	3/3	0	–	–
Overall	79	6,149	48.21	205	21/24	3	40.00	1/8

=== Test centuries ===
The following table summarises the Test match centuries scored by Harvey.

- In the column Runs, * indicates being not out.
- The column Match refers to the Test match number of Harvey's career.

Runs	Match	Opponent	City	Venue	Year	Result
153	2	India	Melbourne, Australia	Melbourne Cricket Ground	1948	Won
112	3	England	Leeds, England	Headingley	1948	Won
178	6	South Africa	Cape Town, South Africa	Newlands	1949	Won
151*	7	South Africa	Durban, South Africa	Kingsmead	1950	Won
100	8	South Africa	Johannesburg, South Africa	Ellis Park	1950	Drawn
116	9	South Africa	Port Elizabeth, South Africa	St George's Park	1950	Won
109	20	South Africa	Brisbane, Australia	Brisbane Cricket Ground	1952	Won
190	22	South Africa	Sydney, Australia	Sydney Cricket Ground	1953	Won
116	23	South Africa	Adelaide, Australia	Adelaide Oval	1953	Drawn
205	24	South Africa	Melbourne, Australia	Melbourne Cricket Ground	1953	Lost
122	27	England	Manchester, England	Old Trafford Cricket Ground	1953	Drawn
162	30	England	Brisbane, Australia	Brisbane Cricket Ground	1954	Won
133	35	West Indies	Kingston, Jamaica	Sabina Park	1955	Won
133	36	West Indies	Port of Spain, Trinidad	Queen's Park Oval	1955	Drawn
204	39	West Indies	Kingston, Jamaica	Sabina Park	1955	Won
140	47	India	Mumbai, India	Brabourne Stadium	1956	Drawn
167	54	England	Melbourne, Australia	Melbourne Cricket Ground	1958	Won
114	61	India	Delhi, India	Feroz Shah Kotla	1959	Won
102	63	India	Bombay, India	Brabourne Stadium	1960	Drawn
114	70	England	Birmingham, England	Edgbaston	1961	Drawn
154	78	England	Adelaide, Australia	Adelaide Oval	1963	Drawn

== Notes ==
Records
Preceded by Ronald Draper	Oldest living Test cricketer 25 February 2025 –	Succeeded by Incumbent
