= Fish Markham =

South African cricketer

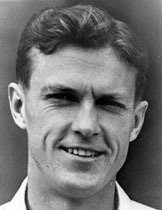

Personal information
- Full name: Lawrence Anderson Markham
- Born: 1 September 1924; Mbabane, Swaziland Protectorate
- Died: 5 August 2000 (aged 75); Pietermaritzburg, KwaZulu-Natal, South Africa
- Nickname: Fish
- Batting: Right-handed
- Bowling: Legbreak
- Relatives: Neville Markham (brother)

International information
- National side: South Africa

Domestic team information
- Years: Team
- 1946–47 – 1950–51: Natal

Career statistics
Competition	Tests	First-class
Matches	1	17
Runs scored	20	268
Batting average	20.00	15.76
100s/50s	0/0	1/0
Top score	20	134
Balls bowled	104	2135
Wickets	1	53
Bowling average	72.00	16.84
5 wickets in innings	0	3
10 wickets in match	0	0
Best bowling	1/34	7/106
Catches/stumpings	0/0	6/-
- Source: Cricinfo, 12 December 2021

Lawrence Anderson "Fish" Markham (12 September 1924 – 5 August 2000) was a South African cricketer who played in one Test in 1949.

== Biography ==
Markham was a right-arm leg-break bowler and a right-handed lower-order batsman. His single Test was the fourth match of the 1948–49 England tour series, and he was the third spin bowler alongside Tufty Mann and Athol Rowan. He scored 20 in his single innings and took just one wicket in the game and was dropped for the next match.

He played first-class cricket for Natal from 1946 to 1950. His best figures were 7 for 106 against Western Province in the 1947–48 Currie Cup. His highest score was 134, batting at number nine against Orange Free State a few weeks later, when he went to the wicket at 166 for 7 and added 174 for the eighth wicket with Ossie Dawson; he then took three wickets in each innings to give Natal an innings' victory.

As of 2025, he is the only Test cricketer to have been born in Swaziland.

== See also ==
- List of Test cricketers born in non-Test playing nations
