= Dudley Nourse =

South African Test cricketer (1910–1981)

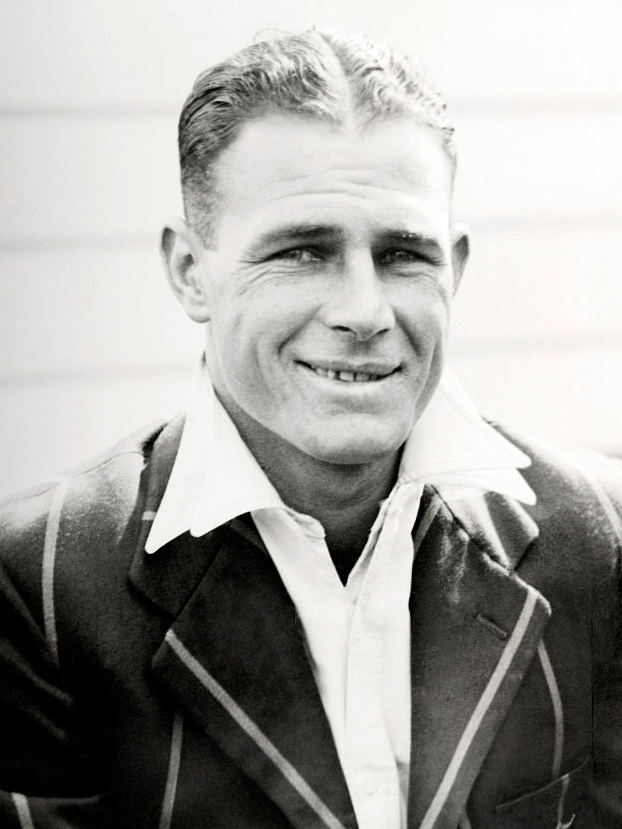

Personal information
- Full name: Arthur Dudley Nourse
- Born: 12 November 1910; Durban, Natal, South Africa
- Died: 14 August 1981 (aged 70); Durban, Natal, South Africa
- Batting: Right-handed
- Bowling: Right-arm
- Role: Batsman
- Relatives: Dave Nourse (Father)

International information
- National side: South Africa
- Test debut (cap 140): 15 June 1935 v England
- Last Test: 16 August 1951 v England

Domestic team information
- Years: Team
- 1931–1953: Natal

Career statistics
| Competition | Test | First-class |
|---|---|---|
| Matches | 34 | 175 |
| Runs scored | 2,960 | 12,472 |
| Batting average | 53.81 | 51.53 |
| 100s/50s | 9/14 | 41/54 |
| Top score | 231 | 260* |
| Balls bowled | 20 | 250 |
| Wickets | 0 | 0 |
| Bowling average | – | – |
| 5 wickets in innings | – | – |
| 10 wickets in match | – | – |
| Best bowling | – | – |
| Catches/stumpings | 12/0 | 135/0 |
- Source: CricketArchive, 30 January 2009

Arthur Dudley Nourse (12 November 1910 – 14 August 1981) was a South African Test cricketer. Primarily a batsman, he was captain of the South African team from 1948 to 1951.

== Early life ==
Nourse was born in Durban, the son of South African Test cricketer Arthur (Dave) Nourse. His father represented South Africa in 45 consecutive Test matches from 1902 to 1924.

He was named after William Ward, 2nd Earl of Dudley, who was the Governor-General of Australia in 1910. Nourse was born a few days after his father scored a double hundred against South Australia, where he was touring with the South African team. When Lord Dudley heard about the innings and the baby, he expressed the wish that he be named after him.

== Career ==
Nourse played cricket and football in his early years. His father refused to teach him how to play cricket, insisting that Dudley teach himself like he had. Aged 18, Nourse decided to concentrate on cricket, initially playing for Umbilo Cricket Club in Durban. He played domestic first-class cricket for the Natal cricket team from 1931 to 1952, and played 34 Test matches for South Africa, in a long international career of 16 years, from 1935 to 1951. He scored a century in his second match for Natal, when his father was playing for the opposing team, Western Province.

He was an aggressive batman, stocky in build like his father, particularly later in his career, with broad shoulders and strong arms. He played mainly off the back foot, cutting square, hooking, and driving on the off side. He was also a good fielder with safe hands.

He joined the tour to England in 1935, in a team captained by Herby Wade, where he made his Test debut. After he scored a century in three consecutive innings, both innings against Surrey and then against Oxford, Plum Warner commented "A Nourse, a Nourse, my kingdom for a Nourse." He made small scores in the first two Tests and was dropped for the Third Test, but then reached 53 not out in the second innings of the Fourth Test at Old Trafford. Four matches were drawn, but South Africa won the Second Test at Lord's, and the series 1–0.

He played at home against Australia in 1935–36. In the second Test in Johannesburg, he made a duck in the first innings and scored 231 in the Second Test, his maiden Test century. Nourse is the only batsman to score a double century in the second innings of a Test match after being out for a duck in the first innings. The match was controversially drawn after the South Africa captain Wade appealed to the umpires against the bad light causing danger to his players, the first time that a fielding captain had successfully appealed against the light; Australia won the other four matches, and the series 4–0. The international schedule of the day meant that South Africa did not play Test cricket for three years, but Nourse then played against the English tourists in 1938–39, taking six hours to score a century in the famous 10-day-long timeless Test at Durban.

In his prime as a player, Nourse lost six years of international cricket during the Second World War, during which time he served in the Middle East. South Africa resumed Test cricket in 1947, and Nourse joined the tour to England as vice-captain under Alan Melville. South Africa lost the series 3–0. Nourse topped the South African batting averages, and he and Melville were Wisden Cricketers of the Year in 1948.

== As captain ==
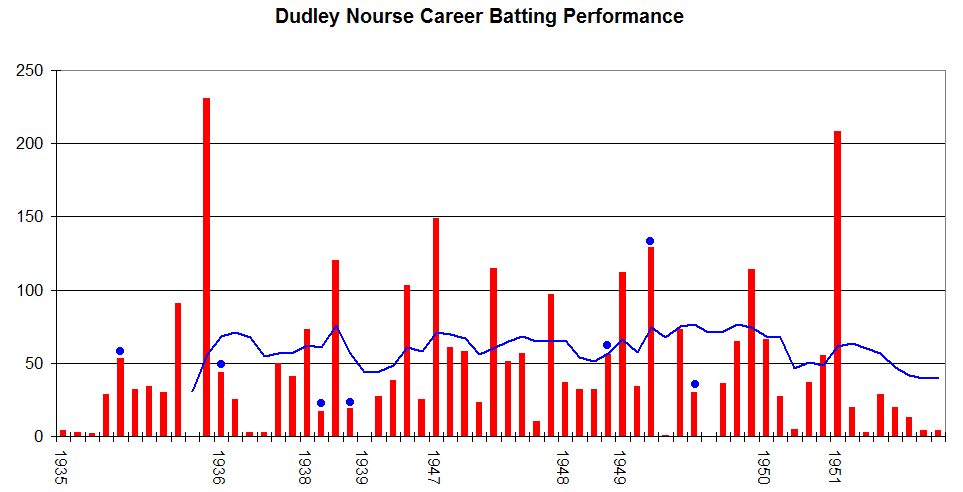
Nourse's career performance graph.

Nourse was appointed captain of South Africa for its home series against England in 1948–49, and remained captain until he retired in 1951. He captained his country in fifteen matches, the two home series against England in 1948–49 which was lost 2–0 and against Australia in 1949–50 which was lost 4–0, and the tour to England in 1951.

It was as captain in the 1951 series that he played what Cricinfo describes as "his most renowned innings", against England in the First Test at Trent Bridge in 1951. He batted for 9 hours, with a pin in his right thumb that had been broken while fielding in an earlier tour match. Each batting stroke exacerbated his increasingly painful thumb; nonetheless, he scored 208 in the first innings. He was then unable to field, or bat in the second innings. His innings was the first double century by a South African against England, and was enough to give South Africa its first Test win in 16 years – Nourse's first as captain, and only his second as a player (the other was also against England, at Lord's in 1935). England won three of the remaining matches, with the Fourth Test at Headingley drawn, and South Africa lost the series 3–1.

== Later life ==
Nourse retired from Test cricket at the end of the 1951 tour, after the Fifth Test, and played his last first-class match in 1953. He was South African Cricket Annual Cricketer of the Year in 1952.

At the time of his retirement, he held the highest Test batting average of any South African batsman (currently surpassed only by Barry Richards, Graeme Pollock and Jacques Kallis). He scored 9 Test centuries, including 7 against England, and is a member of the short list of Test batsmen to retire with a batting average exceeding 50 runs.

His autobiography Cricket in the Blood was published in 1949. He served as a selector for South Africa, and managed the side that toured England in 1960, captained by Jackie McGlew.

He died in Durban.
