= Basil Malan =

South African cricket umpire (1911–1967)

Personal information
- Full name: Basil Vere Malan
- Born: October 1911; Pretoria, South Africa
- Died: 20 June 1967 (aged 55); Pretoria, South Africa

Umpiring information
- Tests umpired: 6 (1950–1957)
- Source: Cricinfo, 11 July 2013

Basil Malan (October 1911 – 20 June 1967) was a South African cricket umpire. He stood in six Test matches between 1950 and 1957.

== See also ==
- List of Test cricket umpires
