= Tufty Mann =

South African cricketer (1920–1952)

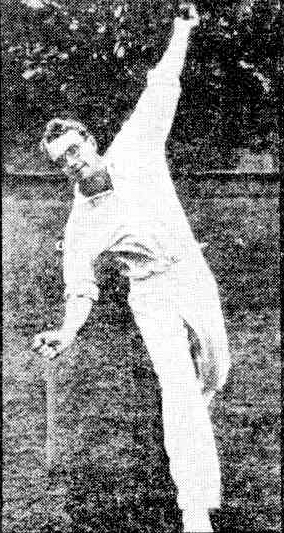

Personal information
- Born: 28 December 1920; Benoni, Transvaal
- Died: 31 July 1952 (aged 31); Hillbrow, Johannesburg
- Batting: Right-handed
- Bowling: Slow left-arm orthodox

International information
- National side: South Africa
- Test debut: 7 June 1947 v England
- Last Test: 26 July 1951 v England

Career statistics
Competition	Test	First-class
Matches	19	73
Runs scored	400	1,446
Batting average	13.33	17.42
100s/50s	0/1	0/3
Top score	52	97
Balls bowled	5,796	20,373
Wickets	58	251
Bowling average	33.10	23.71
5 wickets in innings	1	14
10 wickets in match	0	3
Best bowling	6/59	8/59
Catches/stumpings	3/–	25/–
- Source: Cricinfo, 15 November 2022

Norman Bertram Fleetwood "Tufty" Mann (28 December 1920 – 31 July 1952) was a South African cricketer who played in 19 Test matches from 1947 to 1951.

Tall, thin and bespectacled, Tufty Mann was a lower-order right-handed batsman and a slow left-arm orthodox spin bowler. He played first-class cricket for Natal in the seasons immediately before and after the Second World War and then played for Eastern Province from 1946 to 1947. But more than two-thirds of his 73 first-class games were for South Africa, on tours to England in 1947 and 1951 and in home series against England and Australia.

== Background and early cricket career ==
Born in Benoni, Transvaal, Mann was educated at the Michaelhouse boarding school in South Africa and Gonville and Caius College, Cambridge University. He came to the fore in golf first and at the age of 16 he won the Natal Amateur Golf Championship. He won a blue for golf in the annual match between Cambridge University and Oxford University. He did not play cricket for the University's first team; he played in the Freshman's trial match, but did not take any wickets and was not tried again.

Back in South Africa the following winter, however, Mann made his first-class cricket debut for Natal in five games in the 1939–40 season and bowled economically in them, though he did not take more than three wickets in any one innings.

Mann served in the Second World War and was captured in the fighting in Italy; he escaped from a prisoner of war camp and was "hidden by peasants", according to his obituary in Wisden Cricketers' Almanack. He kept a large diary of his exploits in wartime and on his cricket visit to England in 1951 was attempting to sell his memoirs. In his will published after his death in 1952 he left £400 to two Italian farmers who had sheltered him in the North Italian marshes after he had escaped.

After war service, Mann returned to Natal but, as in 1939–40, in his three matches for the team in 1945–46 he failed to take more than three wickets in an innings. A move to Eastern Province in 1946–47 brought immediate dividends. In his first match for his new team, he took six wickets in Transvaal's first innings at a cost of 69 runs; more remarkable by modern standards was the economy, for the wickets, five of them Test batsmen, came in 67.6 eight-ball overs, 38 of which were maidens. At the time, the 542 balls he bowled were the most in any single innings in first-class cricket. He followed that with six for 126 against another Test-batsman-filled team, Natal, in the next match. The bowling won him a place in the 1947 South African team to England.

== Test cricketer in England ==
The 1947 English cricket season was dominated by the batting exploits of Denis Compton and Bill Edrich, who both broke records for the number of runs scored in a season. Mann's accuracy was one of the few factors that could subdue the English pair, and his first bowling in Test cricket, in the first game of the five-match series, was a spell of eight successive maidens; he finished the innings with figures of no wickets for 10 runs in 20 overs. He followed that up when England followed on with second-innings figures of one for 94 in 60 overs: the single wicket that he took was that of Compton, but Compton had made 163 by that stage and the match was easily saved.

The first Test figures illustrated Mann's value to the South African side, but also his limitations. "Mann rarely departed from his orthodox going-away ball on the middle or off stump and on account of his low trajectory batsmen seldom were able to get to the pitch," Wisden wrote. In a sunny, warm summer, Mann was often used as a defensive bowler, but when there was a helpful wicket, he was at times able to impart some spin to the ball: Wisden recorded in the third Test, as England chased a small target for victory on a worn pitch, that "Mann's left-arm leg-breaks began to turn nastily... Hutton and Compton found this to their cost" as Mann dismissed both before the match was won by England.

In the Test series as a whole, which England won by three matches to nil, with two draws, Mann was the South Africans' most successful bowler, taking 15 wickets at an average of 40.20 and bowling 329.5 overs: an economy rate of 1.83 runs an over. He conceded less than two runs an over when Edrich (189) and Compton (208) shared a third-wicket partnership of 370 in the second Test, and ended the stand by bowling Edrich, his only wicket in the match. His best bowling return of the series in a single innings came in the fourth game when he took four for 68 in 50 overs in England's first innings. And in the final match he took four for 93 in 64 overs and followed that up with two for 102 in 27 overs – England were hitting out to secure a declaration in a high-scoring match that ended as a draw.

In all first-class matches, Mann took 74 wickets at an average of 25.25 and bowled 351 maiden overs. He had particular success in a late-season match against Kent when he followed first-innings bowling of six for 132 with a second-innings return of seven for 95. His batting was occasionally successful too: against Glamorgan he hit 97 in 55 minutes, including a six and 13 fours, and was out to "a deep-field catch" going for his century. This would remain his highest first-class score.

== Test series in South Africa ==
Mann returned to South Africa for the 1947–48 domestic cricket season and in the first game took the best bowling figures of his career: eight for 59 against Western Province. For the two seasons that followed, however, domestic cricket took a back-seat to the tours of South Africa by, in 1948–49, an England team and then in 1949–50, a team from Australia. Mann played in all 10 Tests on these two tours and in only a single other first-class match in each season, and those other games were also against the touring sides.

In the series against England, Mann headed the South African bowling averages, though with 17 wickets he took fewer than Cuan McCarthy and Athol Rowan. Played mainly on batsman-friendly pitches and with the South Africans in particular often batting very defensively, the series was won by England by 2–0 with three drawn matches and there was a lot of bowling for South Africa's main three bowlers. It was in this series, when a particularly drawn-out innings by the England captain George Mann ended with his dismissal by Tufty Mann that broadcaster John Arlott summed up the innings as "a case of Mann's inhumanity to Mann". Mann's best bowling figures came in the tight first match which was affected by rain and which England won very narrowly by two wickets: he took six first-innings wickets for 59 runs, but in the second innings he and Rowan, who had taken the other four wickets in the first innings, were hampered by a wet ball and bowled very little. Conditions got easier for batsmen in the next match: Mann had a spell in which he took three middle-order English wickets while only 10 runs were added, but the score was 540 for three before the first of these wickets fell, and they were his only wickets of the match. For the third and fourth matches of the series, the selectors packed the South African side with bowlers in an attempt to take wickets; a consequence was that Mann bowled very little and failed to take a wicket in either match, though his fellow spin bowler, Rowan, was used more and was successful. In the fifth and final game, the fringe bowlers were left out so Rowan and Mann did most of the bowling and took 15 of the 17 England wickets to fall. In the second innings of this game England were set 172 to win in 95 minutes and achieved the target; Mann's 9.7 overs – eight-ball overs were used in this series – cost 65 runs and brought him four wickets, one of the few times in his career when he was hit in this way.

The Australian tour to South Africa in 1949–50 was an even less successful event for the South African side than the England tour had been: the Australians won four of the five Tests and had the better of the drawn game. South Africa's bowling was ostensibly hampered by an injury to Rowan which kept him out of all the Tests, though Hugh Tayfield emerged as a spin partner for Mann and the real weakness, shown in the series figures, was in seam bowling – Tayfield took 17 wickets in the series, Mann, 16 and the other bowlers only 17 between them. Mann's best innings figures for the series came in the second match, where he took four for 105 as the Australians scored 526 for seven before declaring. The Australian first innings of the following Test, the third, was the only time in the series when the South African bowlers got on top of the Australian batsmen, and Tayfield took seven for 23 and Mann three for 31 as the touring team was dismissed for just 75 to give the South Africans a first-innings lead of 236: Mann and Tayfield were unable to repeat the feat in the second innings, however, and the Australians won the match by five wickets. The fourth Test of the series was the only drawn game; Mann took no wickets, but he scored 52, his only Test match half century.

== Back to England ==
Mann was picked for his second tour of England with the 1951 team. In the early matches of the tour, his defensive rather than his wicket-taking talents were to the fore: by the start of June, he had taken only 14 first-class wickets, but more than a third of his overs were maidens and he was averaging less than 1.8 runs per over from his bowling. In the first Test, following two large first innings, the South Africans struggled in their second innings against Alec Bedser and set England just 186 to win on a pitch that was affected by rain. Athol Rowan and Mann bowled England out for 114 and Mann's four for 24 came in 24 overs, of which 16 were maidens. The Times commented on Mann's accuracy which was, it wrote, as if "bowling on a sixpenny-piece over after over"; when he took his first wicket, that of Jack Ikin, his figures were one for six runs off 15 overs. The next two Tests were not successful either for Mann personally or for his team, with both games lost, and the fourth match of the series was played on a batting pitch at Leeds and Mann bowled 60 overs, taking three for 97, as England matched South Africa by scoring more than 500 before rain washed out the final day. The fifth and final Test at The Oval was played on a pitch that suited spin bowlers, but Mann was not fit to play: his absence, Wisden wrote, "was keenly felt, for the pitch should have proved ideal for his left-arm slow bowling". He returned to the team for one final county match against Middlesex at Lord's, but the game was washed out and he did not take a wicket in just six overs of bowling. On the tour as a whole, Mann's parsimony had left him top of the South African Test bowling averages with 10 wickets at an average of 26.40, and in all first-class matches he had taken 44 wickets at 26.38.

== Illness and death ==
At the end of the tour of England, 14 of the 16 South African players departed for home on the Union Castle Line ship MV Winchester Castle; the exceptions were Cuan McCarthy, who started at Cambridge University, and Mann, who "is staying in England for medical treatment". Mann had "an abdominal operation" in England, where he stayed in the hospital for three months, having been joined in England by his wife, Daphne. He was able to return to South Africa, but needed a second operation in mid-1952 and died six weeks later, on 31 July 1952 in Hillbrow.
