= Ian Johnston (cricketer) =

Cricket information
- Batting: Right-handed
- Bowling: Right-arm medium

International information
- National side: Ireland

Career statistics
Competition	First-class	List A
Matches	3	2
Runs scored	86	30
Batting average	28.66	15.00
100s/50s	0/0	0/0
Top score	34	17
Balls bowled	6	18
Wickets	0	1
Bowling average	–	25.00
5 wickets in innings	–	0
10 wickets in match	–	0
Best bowling	–	1/25
Catches/stumpings	3/–	0/–
- Source: CricketArchive, 16 November 2022

Robert Ian Johnston (born 1 July 1948) is an Irish former cricketer. A right-handed batsman and right-arm medium pace bowler, he played 15 times for the Ireland cricket team between 1979 and 1983, including three first-class matches and two List A matches.

== Playing career ==
Johnston made his debut for Ireland against Surrey in June 1979 and made his first-class debut against Sri Lanka the following month. He also played against FW Millett's XI, Scotland, the MCC, Wales and Worcestershire in 1979. He played four times in 1980, including two matches against the West Indies and his List A debut against Middlesex at Lord's. He played against Canada and Middlesex in 1981, and against Sussex and Scotland in 1983, his final games for Ireland.

== Statistics ==
In all matches for Ireland, Johnston scored 361 runs at an average of 24.07, scoring two half-centuries with a top score of 72 against the MCC in June 1980. He took four wickets at an average of 45.29, with best innings bowling figures of 2/49 against Middlesex in July 1981.
