= Jack Hart-Davis =

South African cricket umpire

Personal information
- Full name: Jack Vaughan Hart-Davis
- Born: 1900
- Died: 25 April 1963 (aged 62–63); Natal, South Africa

Umpiring information
- Tests umpired: 4 (1948–1950)
- Source: Cricinfo, 7 July 2013

Jack Hart-Davis (1900 – 25 April 1963) was a South African cricket umpire. He stood in four Test matches between 1948 and 1950.

== See also ==
- List of Test cricket umpires
