= Richard Ashman =

South African cricketer and cricket umpire

Personal information
- Full name: Richard Gerald Alfred Ashman
- Born: 24 November 1899; Westminster, London, England
- Died: 15 May 1965 (aged 65); Bloemfontein, South Africa
- Role: Umpire

Domestic team information
- Years: Team
- 1931–1932: Orange Free State
- FC debut: 21 December 1931 Orange Free State v Rhodesia
- Last FC: 16 December 1932 Orange Free State v Griqualand West

Umpiring information
- Tests umpired: 14 (1935–1949)
- FC umpired: 24 (1931–1949)

Career statistics
| Competition | First-class |
|---|---|
| Matches | 6 |
| Runs scored | 29 |
| Batting average | 5.80 |
| 100s/50s | 0/0 |
| Top score | 14 * |
| Catches/stumpings | 8/2 |
- Source: Cricinfo, 19 June 2013

Richard Gerald Alfred Ashman (24 November 1899 – 15 May 1965) was a South African cricketer and cricket umpire.

In domestic first-class cricket, Ashman played six games as a wicket-keeper for Orange Free State from December 1931 to December 1932.

Ashman umpired 24 first-class matches in South Africa between 1931 and 1950. His Test umpiring career commenced in 1935 when he officiated in the second South Africa–Australia Test at Johannesburg in December. He umpired all five Tests between South Africa and England in 1938–39. His 14th and final Test as umpire was in January 1950, another match between South Africa and Australia.
