= Eric Rowan =

South African cricketer

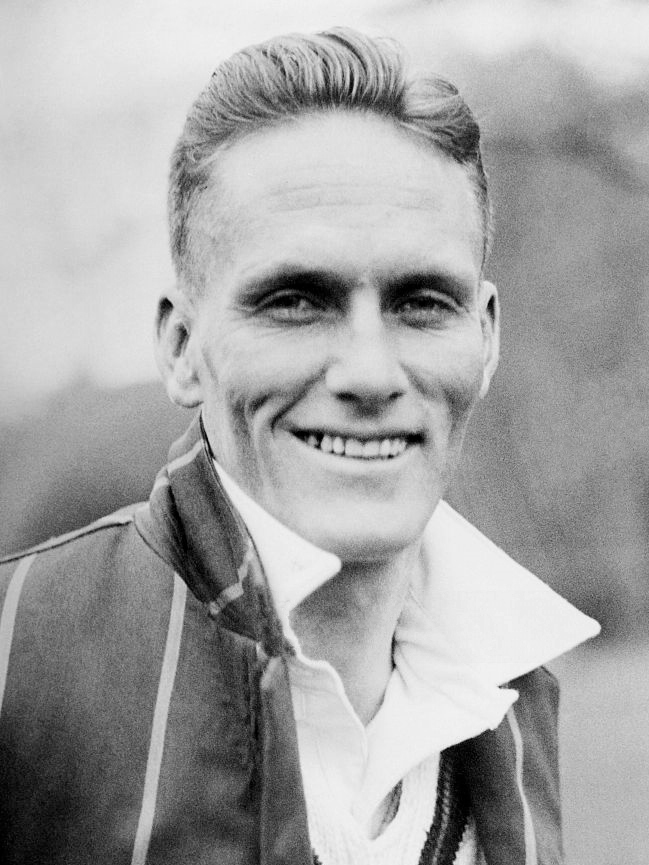
- Rowan in 1935

Personal information
- Born: 20 July 1909; Johannesburg, Colony of Transvaal
- Died: 30 April 1993 (aged 83); Johannesburg, Transvaal, South Africa
- Batting: Right-handed
- Bowling: Legbreak

International information
- National side: South Africa
- Test debut: 15 June 1935 v England
- Last Test: 16 August 1951 v England

Career statistics
Competition	Test	First-class
Matches	26	157
Runs scored	1,965	11,710
Batting average	43.66	48.58
100s/50s	3/12	30/54
Top score	236	306*
Balls bowled	19	443
Wickets	0	4
Bowling average	–	42.00
5 wickets in innings	–	0
10 wickets in match	–	0
Best bowling	–	3/11
Catches/stumpings	14/–	83/–
- Source: Cricinfo, 7 August 2019

Eric Alfred Burchell Rowan (20 July 1909 – 30 April 1993) was a South African cricketer who played for Transvaal, Eastern Province and South Africa.

An opening batsman, Rowan was a dominant personality in South African cricket for more than 20 years on either side of the Second World War. He sometimes batted without gloves and, allegedly, without a "box" protector, and he was fearless against authority too. This led at times to his omission from the South African Test team, notably when he was left out of the 1947 tour to England.

Rowan played for Transvaal from the age of 20, but had to wait five years before making his Test debut on the 1935 tour to England. He had limited success in the Tests on this tour, with a highest score of just 62, but was the leading scorer in first-class games, with 1,948 runs in total and six centuries. In the series against Australia that followed, he began well with 66 and 49 in the first Test, but failed against Clarrie Grimmett in the next two Tests, and was dropped from the team.

Returning to the South African Test team in the 1938–39 series against England, Rowan appeared to have cemented his place with 284 runs in four matches, with a top score of 89 not out. But it was another 10 years before he played Test cricket again, as his clashes with authority led to his omission. Even when he was reinstated, in the 1948–49 home series against England, it was announced during the second Test at Johannesburg that he would be dropped for the next match: he responded by scoring an unbeaten 156 that enabled his team to salvage a draw after they had been 293 behind on the first innings. He played another match-saving innings in the fourth Test of the series.

Rowan's second Test century was 143 against Australia at Durban in 1949–50, the first series since 1935 where he had played all five Tests, and on the 1951 tour to England, his rehabilitation appeared complete, as he was appointed vice-captain to Dudley Nourse. On this tour, he hit his highest Test score, 236, in the match at Headingley. He topped both the Test and the first-class averages and his feats led to him being named as a Wisden Cricketer of the Year the following year. But he remained dogged by controversy: in the match against Lancashire, Rowan and wicket-keeper John Waite were barracked for slow scoring, and responded by sitting down on the pitch until there was quiet. Later there was a scuffle involving Rowan in the pavilion.

Though by this time well beyond 40, Rowan's subsequent omission from the South African touring team to Australia in 1952–53 was a further surprise. He responded by having his best season in South African domestic cricket, but he did not play Test cricket again and retired shortly afterwards.

His highest first-class score was 306 not out, made in 462 minutes, for Transvaal against Natal in 1939–40.

His younger brother, Athol, was an off-spin bowler who played 15 Tests for South Africa after the Second World War.

In 1939, Rowan set the test record for the highest score in a test innings by any player without any fours or sixes (67*).In 1978, his record was almost broken by Geoffrey Boycott who scored 77* without hitting a single boundary or a six, but that innings included one all-run four.

Rowan also having the record for being the oldest test cricketer to score a double century (42 years 6 days) He was also the founder of the South Africa and Rhodesia Women's Cricket Association in the 1950s.
