= Cuan McCarthy =

South African cricketer (1929–2000)

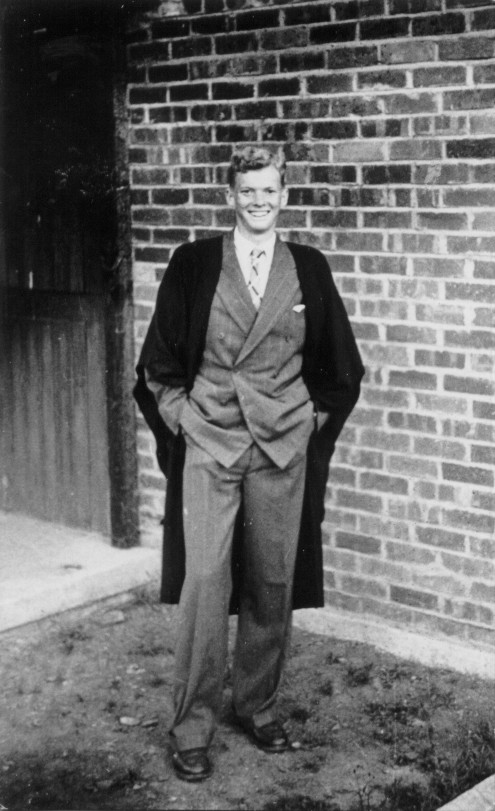

Personal information
- Born: 24 March 1929; Pietermaritzburg, Natal, Union of South Africa
- Died: 14 August 2000 (aged 71); Johannesburg, Gauteng, South Africa
- Height: 6 ft 2 in (1.88 m)
- Batting: Right-handed
- Bowling: Right-arm fast

International information
- National side: South Africa
- Test debut: 16 December 1948 v England
- Last Test: 16 August 1951 v England

Career statistics
| Competition | Test | First-class |
|---|---|---|
| Matches | 15 | 60 |
| Runs scored | 28 | 141 |
| Batting average | 3.11 | 4.27 |
| 100s/50s | 0/0 | 0/0 |
| Top score | 5 | 23* |
| Balls bowled | 3,499 | 11,818 |
| Wickets | 36 | 176 |
| Bowling average | 41.94 | 25.85 |
| 5 wickets in innings | 2 | 8 |
| 10 wickets in match | 0 | 1 |
| Best bowling | 6/43 | 8/36 |
| Catches/stumpings | 6/– | 23/– |
- Source: Cricinfo, 19 November 2022

Cuan Neil McCarthy (24 March 1929 – 14 August 2000) was a South African cricketer who played in fifteen Test matches from 1948 to 1951.

== Life and career ==
One of five children born to Victor and Phyllis McCarthy, Cuan McCarthy grew up on "Glenaholm", a citrus and poultry farm just out of Pietermaritzburg, where his mother bred a famous line of Rhodesian Ridgeback dogs (Glenaholm Kennel). He had Irish ancestry, and received his secondary education at Maritzburg College.

Cuan McCarthy was included in the national side for the first time at the age of 19. Six feet two inches (1.88m) tall, and a bowler of genuine pace who could command a deadly off-cutter, he opened the bowling for South Africa in his 15 Tests, spanning 1948 to 1951. He was no batsman and stands as one of the few cricketers to have taken more wickets than the number of runs scored: up to the end of 1951 his highest score in forty-five first-class games was only seven. On a pitch freshened by a sharp shower he produced his best bowling figures in his debut Test against the touring England team on his home turf at Kingsmead, taking six wickets for 43 runs in the second innings. In later games it was thought that he too often pitched short when he would have been deadly bowling to a much fuller length. This tendency was seen at its worst in the 1951 tour of England, especially on an extremely difficult pitch at Old Trafford.

The following year, McCarthy moved to Pembroke College, Cambridge, and was viewed as a valuable acquisition by the cricketing press. He bowled extremely well in taking forty-four wickets for the university at an average cost of little over seventeen each, but a controversy arose when at Worcester McCarthy became the first bowler to be no-balled for throwing in English first-class cricket since 1908. He was still allowed to bowl for the rest of the match, and was thought so good that he played for the Gentlemen at Lord's and Scarborough, without meeting with pronounced success.

Although at this point McCarthy was established as a major bowling force, it turned out that he was never to be seen again in first-class cricket. After being at Cambridge in 1952, McCarthy stayed on in Britain but was still thought a candidate for the 1952/1953 tour of Australia. However, he was not chosen and his only later cricket was in the Minor Counties Championship for Dorset, where he settled in subsequent years before returning to South Africa as a farmer.

== Personal life ==
He married Margaret Gillian Trotter in January 1954. The couple had three children. In 1972, he married Valerie Parham from Rhodesia and they had a son.

Pictures
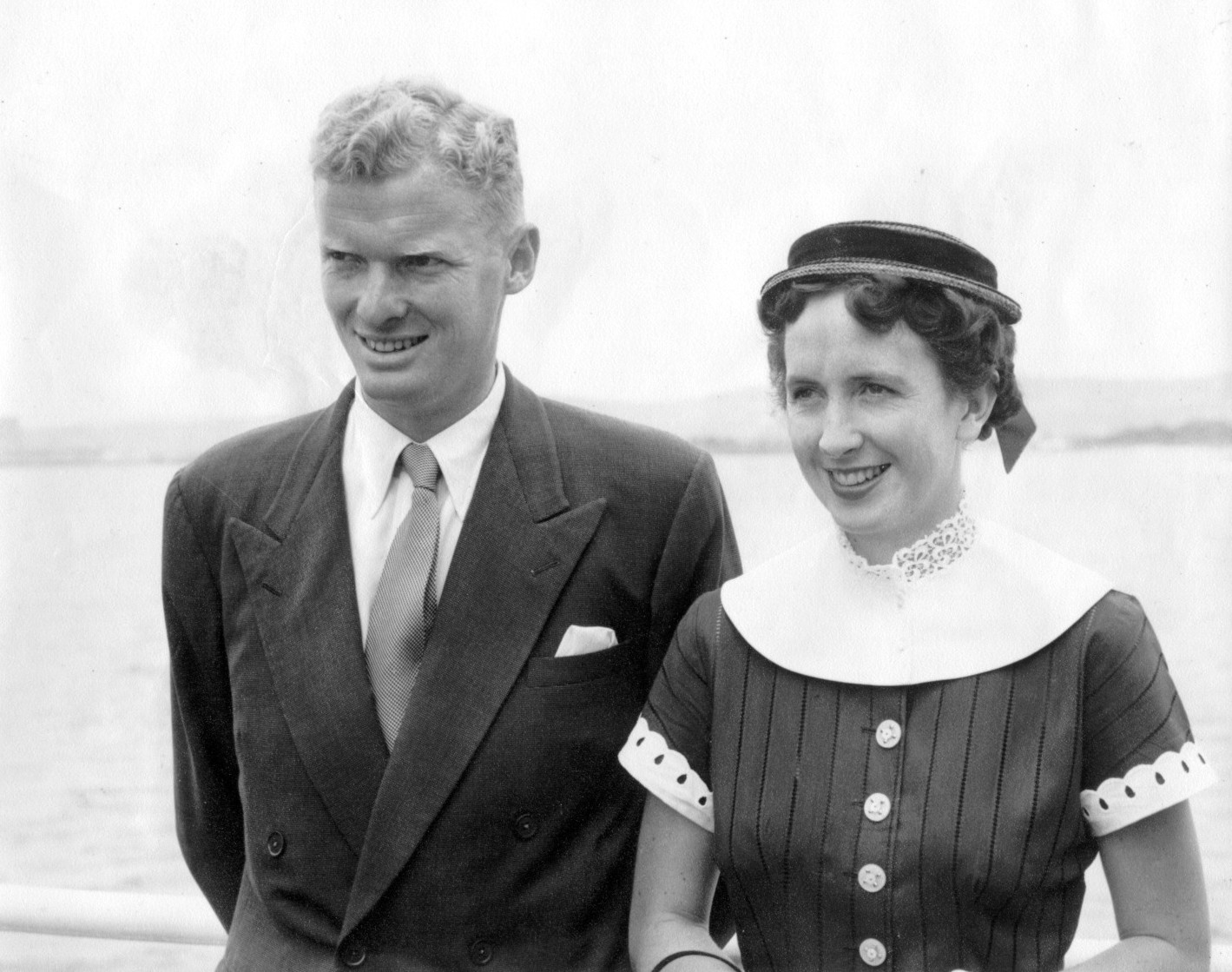
Cuan McCarthy and wife Gillian 1954

Cuan McCarthy in later life

== See also ==
- List of South Africa cricketers who have taken five-wicket hauls on Test debut
