= Athol Rowan =

South African cricketer (1921–1998)

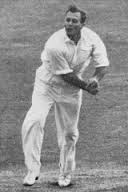

Personal information
- Born: 7 February 1921; Kensington, South Africa
- Died: 22 February 1998 (aged 77); Hermanus, Western Cape
- Batting: Right-handed
- Bowling: Right-arm offbreak

International information
- National side: South Africa
- Test debut: 7 June 1947 v England
- Last Test: 16 August 1951 v England

Career statistics
Competition	Test	First-class
Matches	15	58
Runs scored	290	1,492
Batting average	17.05	24.06
100s/50s	0/0	1/4
Top score	41	100*
Balls bowled	5,193	16,755
Wickets	54	273
Bowling average	38.59	23.47
5 wickets in innings	4	20
10 wickets in match	0	7
Best bowling	5/68	9/19
Catches/stumpings	7/–	25/–
- Source: Cricinfo, 11 March 2020

Athol Matthew Burchell Rowan (7 February 1921 – 22 February 1998) was a South African international cricketer who played in 15 Test matches between 1947 and 1951.

His older brother, Eric, also played Test cricket for South Africa.

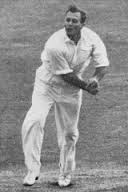
Athol Rowan bowling against England at Trent Bridge on June 10, 1947.
