= 1947 English cricket season =

48th season of County Championship cricket in England

1947 was the 48th season of County Championship cricket in England. It is chiefly remembered for the batting performances of Denis Compton and Bill Edrich who established seasonal records that, with the subsequent reduction in the number of first-class matches, will probably never be broken. Their form was key to their team Middlesex winning the County Championship for the first time since 1921, although they were involved in a tight contest for the title with the eventual runners-up Gloucestershire, for whom Tom Goddard was the most outstanding bowler of the season. Compton and Edrich were assisted by the fact that it was the driest and sunniest English summer for a generation, ensuring plenty of good batting wickets.

The South Africans, captained by Alan Melville, toured the British Isles for the first time since 1935 and played a Test series of five matches against England, who won the series 3–0 with two matches drawn, again largely thanks to the batting of Compton and Edrich. The South Africans enjoyed greater success in first-class matches against the English county teams, losing only one and winning eleven. Other notable fixtures played include the University Match, Gentlemen v Players (twice) and North v South (three matches). The Minor Counties Championship was won by Yorkshire II, one of six first-class teams who entered their second elevens in the competition. Unusually, there were two tied matches in 1947, compared with two in the previous 21 years. Essex v Northamptonshire and Hampshire v Lancashire were the 20th and 21st tied matches in the history of first-class cricket worldwide since the earliest known instance in 1783.

The main source for information about the season is Wisden Cricketers' Almanack, in its 85th edition published in April 1948. This announced the five Wisden Cricketers of the Year for 1947: Martin Donnelly, Alan Melville, Dudley Nourse, Jack Robertson and Norman Yardley. 1947 was the first season to be reviewed by Playfair Cricket Annual, which began publication in April 1948.

== Background ==
The main sources for the 1947 season are the 85th edition of Wisden Cricketers' Almanack and the inaugural edition of Playfair Cricket Annual, both published in April 1948. The 1947 season was therefore the first to be reviewed by Playfair.

The winter of 1946–47 in the United Kingdom was harsh with heavy snowfalls disrupting communication and supply for about six weeks from January to March. February was one of the coldest months on record and the winter culminated in the wettest March for 300 years. Yet it was followed by what Playfair called a "glorious summer" in which fine weather prevailed and, as Wisden says, "the sun shone throughout". This was in sharp contrast to the wet summer of 1946. Despite austerity and rationing, the country was still in post-war euphoria and there was great enthusiasm for sporting events. As Wisden reports, "crowds thronged the grounds (and) Lord's was often full for county games".

Wisden editor Hubert Preston commented in his 1948 editorial that "the season of 1947 bears favourable comparison with any year within living memory". He had expected the continuous fine weather to produce pitch conditions favourable to batsmen and hence the predominance of drawn matches but, as he wrote, "actually about three-quarters of the County Championship matches were won outright".

Playfair editor Peter West wrote that "a grand and glorious summer" had been "a feast amidst austerity indeed, a fine reward for months of waiting through a chill and infamous winter". West went on to claim that "nearly three million people", with the younger generation strongly represented, attended first-class cricket matches in 1947. It must be remembered that this means three million attendances and not literally three million people.

== Honours ==
- Test Series – England 3–0 South Africa; two matches drawn
- County Championship – Middlesex
- Minor Counties Championship – Yorkshire II
- Wisden Cricketers of the Year^{[a]} – Martin Donnelly, Alan Melville, Dudley Nourse, Jack Robertson, Norman Yardley

== South African tour ==
South Africa toured the British Isles in 1947 and played a five-match Test series against England, who won the series 3–0 with two matches drawn. This was the first South African tour of England since 1935, the team captained by Alan Melville who had played in England for Oxford University and Sussex. Wisden commented that despite their lack of success in the Test series, South Africa "gave indication of real ability at all points of the game" and "little more experience is necessary to make them really powerful" in international cricket. Playfair acclaimed the South Africans as a "most popular team (who) enriched the game and set an excellent example", the tour realising a profit of £10,000.

South Africa fared very well in their matches against the county clubs, winning eleven of the eighteen matches and losing only one, which was the opening match of the tour against Worcestershire by 39 runs. They lost to Marylebone Cricket Club (MCC) in May by 158 runs, but in September they had a convincing nine wicket win against the South who included Denis Compton, Bill Edrich and Jack Robertson.

The outstanding South African players were the three best batsmen: Melville, Bruce Mitchell and Dudley Nourse. Ken Viljoen had a good tour and made six centuries but none in the Tests. The bowling was moderate as no one took more than 15 wickets in the series or averaged under forty. Athol Rowan with 102 was the only tourist to take a century of wickets in the season. The team badly lacked pace bowlers and included only two medium-fast seamers, Jack Plimsoll and Lindsay Tuckett, the majority of bowlers being spinners: Rowan, Tufty Mann, Ian Smith and Leslie Payn. South Africa had three wicketkeepers in the party: Johnny Lindsay, Douglas Ovenstone and George Fullerton. Ossie Dawson was an all-rounder and the remaining batsmen were Denis Begbie, Dennis Dyer and Tony Harris. South Africa used fourteen players in the Test series: the ones who missed out were Begbie, Ovenstone and Payn.

=== Test series summary ===
1. Trent Bridge – match drawn.
2. Lord's – England won by 10 wickets.
3. Old Trafford – England won by 7 wickets.
4. Headingley – England won by 10 wickets.
5. The Oval – match drawn.

England's key victory came in the second Test at Lord's where Compton (208) and Edrich (189) shared a partnership of 370 which was a then world record for the third wicket in Test cricket. Doug Wright took ten wickets in the match and England won by ten wickets. In the third Test at Old Trafford, Edrich scored 191 in another big partnership with Compton and took eight wickets in the match. England won the fourth Test at Headingley in only three days by ten wickets. This time it was Len Hutton and Cyril Washbrook who claimed the batting honours while the best bowler was Harold Butler with match figures of seven for 66 on debut.

== England team in 1947 ==
The England team began 1947 on tour in Australia, where they were beaten 3–0 in the Test series, and then toured New Zealand where the sole Test arranged was ruined by rain. Having played South Africa at home in 1947, England's next tour was to the West Indies beginning in January 1948.

England, playing under the auspices of MCC, took 17 players to Australia and New Zealand. Wally Hammond captained the team in his final Test series. The other batsmen were Len Hutton, Cyril Washbrook, Denis Compton, Bill Edrich, James Langridge, Laurie Fishlock and Joe Hardstaff junior. Jack Ikin and Norman Yardley were essentially all-rounders. Godfrey Evans and Paul Gibb were the wicketkeepers and the bowlers were Alec Bedser, Doug Wright, Dick Pollard, Peter Smith and Bill Voce. Gibb, Hardstaff, Hutton and Langridge did not play in New Zealand.

With Hammond having retired from international cricket, Yardley was appointed captain for the home series against South Africa. In the first Test, England recalled Eric Hollies and selected three debutants: Sam Cook, Tom Dollery and Jack Martin. Hutton, Washbrook, Edrich, Compton, Evans and Bedser were retained from the winter tour and these six with Yardley were the mainstays of the England team in 1947. There were changes again for the second Test with Charlie Barnett replacing Dollery, George Pope replacing Martin and Wright coming back in place of Cook. Bedser missed the third Test and was replaced by Cliff Gladwin while Ken Cranston was brought in to replace Pope. In the fourth Test, Jack Young was introduced in place of Hollies and Harold Butler for Gladwin. Edrich missed the last Test, as again did Bedser, and there were yet more changes elsewhere with Dick Howorth coming in to replace Barnett and Bill Copson replacing Butler. Jack Robertson took Edrich's place. It all meant that, in a five-match series they won 3–0, England used 21 different players.

With so many players under consideration, it was difficult to predict who would go to the West Indies in the winter and that question became even more complex when several players decided not to go. Bedser, Compton, Edrich, Hutton, Wright and Yardley from the 1947 series all declined the tour before the squad was selected, as did Trevor Bailey who was in contention for a place. With Yardley missing, MCC reappointed pre-war captain Gubby Allen to lead the party but he was the first in a spate of injuries when he damaged a leg muscle on the outward voyage. Following further injuries to Dennis Brookes and Joe Hardstaff junior, Allen asked MCC to send reinforcements and Hutton then changed his mind, flying out just in time to play against British Guiana.

Of the players who went to the West Indies, the only ones who had played against South Africa in the summer were Hutton, Evans, Cranston, Robertson, Howorth and Butler. Hardstaff and Ikin had been to Australia and New Zealand the previous winter. The other eight were Allen and seven newcomers: Dennis Brookes, Billy Griffith, Jim Laker, Winston Place, Gerald Smithson, Maurice Tremlett and Johnny Wardle. Playfair was disappointed with the situation in the West Indies, especially as England were well beaten in the Test series. The team, it said, "could not be called great by any standards" as it was too "experimental" but it at least seemed "workmanlike" and in Laker a new star had been discovered. Playfair ominously concluded its review by reference to the 1948 Australian team being "about to descend upon us well armed in all key departments (and) we shall have to do better than this".

== County Championship ==
Middlesex won the County Championship under the captaincy of Walter Robins, who stood down at the end of the season.

== Other major fixtures ==
=== MCC v Yorkshire ===
At the beginning of the season, on 3, 5 and 6 May, Marylebone Cricket Club (MCC) played a three-day match at Lord's against the 1946 county champions, Yorkshire. MCC won by 163 runs. The MCC team in batting order was Dennis Brookes (Northamptonshire), Jack Robertson (Middlesex), Bob Wyatt (Worcestershire), Denis Compton (Middlesex), Bryan Valentine (Kent, captain), Leslie Compton (Middlesex, wicketkeeper), Wilf Wooller (Glamorgan), Haydn Davies (Glamorgan), Jack Young (Middlesex), Rowland Shaddick (Middlesex) and Jack Martin (Kent). MCC won the toss and chose to bat first but were bowled out in 57 overs for 134, Denis Compton making 73. Yorkshire got off to a very bad start when Len Hutton was dismissed by Jack Martin for nought. This began an outstanding spell for Martin who finished with six for 23 from 12.1 overs as Yorkshire collapsed to 81 all out. At close of play on the Saturday, MCC were 67 for one with Jack Robertson 36 not out. On the Monday, Robertson built a big innings and scored 164 of a declared total of 343 for 9. Yorkshire's hopes slumped when Hutton was again dismissed cheaply and at close of play they were 69 for two. Vic Wilson tried his best and scored 74, which was his highest career score to date, but Jack Young was in fine form and took six for 85 to win the match for MCC.

=== University Match ===
The 1947 University Match between Oxford University and Cambridge University was played at Lord's over three days from 5 to 8 July and was drawn. Oxford batted first and amassed 457 with Kent's Tony Pawson scoring a chanceless 135 before being run out. Geoffrey Keighley made 99 and Test batsman Martin Donnelly 81. Cambridge could manage only 201 in reply as Oxford's other Test player Abdul Hafeez Kardar took four for 50. Following on, Cambridge rallied to 314 for four and ensured the draw, Guy Willatt scoring 90 and Trevor Bailey 60 not out.

Donnelly (New Zealand) and Kardar (India) both played Test cricket before winning their "Blues" and no university team had ever before included two Test players in the same year. Cambridge had a notable future Test player in Trevor Bailey (England). Donnelly was the first university batsman ever to score 1,000 runs before the University Match in two successive seasons. Playfair praised Donnelly as "the finest left-hand batsman in the world", ahead of even the Australians Arthur Morris and Neil Harvey.

=== Gentlemen v Players ===
There were two Gentlemen v Players matches in 1947. The first was played at Lord's over three days from 16 to 18 July and was drawn after rain restricted play on the last two days. The second was played at the North Marine Road ground in Scarborough from 10 to 12 September and the Players won by an innings and 10 runs.

Martin Donnelly dominated the Lord's match with "a truly magnificent innings", scoring 162 not out as the Gentlemen made 302 in the first innings, Bill Edrich scoring 79. The Players replied with 334 for eight declared, Cyril Washbrook scoring 101 and David Fletcher 77. The Gentlemen slumped to 25 for five as wickets fell to Cliff Gladwin and Harold Butler but were rescued by Norman Yardley and Ken Cranston, rain ensuring that the result was a draw. The Gentlemen were led by England captain Norman Yardley and selected three Oxford University players — Donnelly, Tony Pawson and Tony Mallett — and two from Cambridge University: Guy Willatt and Trevor Bailey. The team included current England players Edrich and Cranston while Billy Griffith kept wicket. Reg Simpson made his first appearance in the fixture but could only score 4 and 0. The Players were captained by Les Ames who played as a batsman, Godfrey Evans keeping wicket. Washbrook opened with Jack Robertson, the other batsmen being Denis Compton, Charlie Barnett and Fletcher. The pace bowlers were Butler and Gladwin, supported by spinners Jack Walsh and Doug Wright.

At Scarborough two months later, a much weaker Gentlemen team were easily beaten by an innings after totalling 135 and 217 against 362. Denys Wilcox opened the innings and did well with scores of 25 and 57 while skipper Yardley made 35 and 23, but Edrich and Donnelly did not contribute many against a strong Players attack, particularly Dick Howorth who took four wickets in each innings. The Players had three England pace bowlers: Butler, Alec Bedser and Dick Pollard. Howorth top-scored for the Players too, with 80, and captain Len Hutton scored 64.

=== North v South ===
There were three North v South matches in 1947, involving largely makeshift teams, and Playfair did not bother to report on them. The first was at the St George's Road Cricket Ground, Harrogate over three days from 27 to 29 August and the North won by 86 runs. The second was played at the Leyland Motors Ground in Kingston-upon-Thames from 3 to 5 September and the South won by 4 wickets. The final match was played at North Marine Road Ground, Scarborough from 6 to 9 September and was drawn.

=== Middlesex v The Rest ===
Having won the County Championship, Middlesex played a representative team called The Rest (i.e., the Rest of England) at The Oval in a four-day match lasting from 13 to 17 September. Middlesex won by 9 wickets. The Rest was a very strong team entirely consisting of players who had played or would play for England at Test level. In batting order, they were Cyril Washbrook, Winston Place, Dick Howorth, George Emmett, Norman Yardley (captain), Ken Cranston, Godfrey Evans (wicketkeeper), Alec Bedser, Doug Wright, Tom Goddard and Harold Butler. Middlesex won the toss and decided to bat first but were soon reduced to 8 for two as Bedser dismissed both openers Syd Brown and Jack Robertson. Bill Edrich and George Mann took the score on to 53 for three when Mann, who had scored 33, was stumped by Evans off Wright. This brought Edrich and Denis Compton together. In keeping with their form throughout the season, they amassed 426 runs between them and enabled skipper Walter Robins to declare at 543 for nine. Edrich made 180 which was just enough for him to surpass Tom Hayward's old record season aggregate, which Compton had already beaten. Compton retired hurt when he had scored 55 and the total was 191 for three. He returned with his knee strapped when the score was 274 for four and, despite his injury, he went on to make 246, his highest score of the season. Robins made 33 while Compton was off the field but the tailenders did not score many. The Rest were bowled out for 246 and followed on. They made 317 in their second innings, leaving Middlesex to win the match with 21 for one.

== Minor Counties Championship ==
Six first-class clubs entered their "second elevens" into the Minor Counties Championship in 1947 and Playfair reported that five more would do so in 1948. Teams played each other irregularly and a league table was compiled on the basis of average points per match played. A win was worth ten points with lesser awards given in certain specific circumstances. All teams played at least eight matches, the most being fourteen by Yorkshire II. The leading teams in the table were Surrey II, Yorkshire II, Lancashire II, Staffordshire, Suffolk and Oxfordshire who each exceeded five points per match.

To decide the championship, a challenge match took place at The Oval on 4 to 6 September and Yorkshire II defeated Surrey II by 111 runs. Future first-class players taking part included Tony Lock, Vic Wilson, Stuart Surridge, Ron Aspinall and Bernie Constable.

== Compton and Edrich ==
Playfair described 1947 as "the Edrich and Compton year" and remarked that their domination of first-class cricket through the season was unprecedented. Between them, they scored 7,355 runs, took 140 wickets and held 66 catches. It is improbable that the records achieved by Compton of most runs and most centuries in a season will ever be broken, especially since the reduction in first-class matches which began in 1969. What will be remembered is not the statistics but the style because Compton and Edrich scored quickly and played attacking cricket.

Playfair described Compton as "a genius" who was brilliant at improvisation; Edrich on the other hand was "not a genius but a wonderfully efficient batsman". Both men were hampered by injuries. Compton had a bad knee caused by a piece of chipped bone which was removed after the season ended. Edrich suffered a pulled shoulder muscle in early August which impeded his batting and prevented him from bowling again. When the season began in May, Edrich scored a century in his first innings and followed up with two more, including a score of 225, before the end of the month. Compton did not score his first century until his eleventh innings. Edrich scored 1,047 runs in the calendar month of July and Compton 1,039 runs in August. Edrich's highest score was 267 not out for Middlesex against Northamptonshire and Compton's was 246 for Middlesex against The Rest.

Wisden published an appreciation of Compton and Edrich written by R. C. Robertson-Glasgow who began by opining that "they go together in English cricket as Gilbert and Sullivan go together in English opera". Robertson-Glasgow made further comparisons, strictly cricket ones this time, with Jack Hobbs and Herbert Sutcliffe for England and with Don Bradman and Bill Ponsford for Australia. However, he tempered his praise by pointing out that Compton and Edrich had yet to "quell the fiercest Test attack" as, although they had dominated the South African bowling in 1947, Australia remained another matter with "fulfilment awaited". While Playfair spoke of "brilliance and efficiency", Robertson-Glasgow eulogised about "genius and talent" and then "poetry and prose" in comparing Compton with Edrich. He concluded by describing them as "fitting adornments and exponents" of cricket, itself a "refreshment from worldly struggle".

== Wisden Cricketers of the Year ==
In its 1948 edition, Wisden Cricketers' Almanack announced that its five cricketers of the 1947 season were Martin Donnelly, Alan Melville, Dudley Nourse, Jack Robertson and Norman Yardley. As a rule, though it has occasionally been broken, Wisden never selects a player more than once. Among players of 1947 who had been selected previously were Les Ames in 1929; Walter Robins in 1930; Bill Bowes in 1932; Bruce Mitchell in 1936; Tom Goddard, Joe Hardstaff junior and Len Hutton in 1938; Denis Compton in 1939; Bill Edrich and Doug Wright in 1940; Peter Smith and Cyril Washbrook in 1947.

Martin Donnelly was rated by Wisden as "the world's best present-day left-handed batsman". Although small in stature, Donnelly was noted for powerful stroke play using the drive, pull and cut shots. Donnelly dominated university cricket in 1947 but his outstanding performance was "an almost faultless 162 not out in three hours" for the Gentlemen against the Players at Lord's. Donnelly was a New Zealand Test batsman who had starred for the Dominions team in 1945.

Alan Melville's career was dogged by injury and family illness. Wisden reflected this by opening its citation with "a story of courage and determination". In 1947, Melville won admiration for his "feeling for the spirit of the game" which was a significant factor in ensuring the success of "a most delightful Test series". Melville enjoyed personal success as a batsman in 1947, especially by scoring centuries at both Trent Bridge and Lord's. Melville was a strong onside batsman, noted for his fine timing. He retired from first-class cricket after the 1947 tour.

Dudley Nourse, son of Dave Nourse, had his best Test series as a batsman in 1947 with 621 runs and two centuries. He was an aggressive batsman, noted for his powerful hitting off the back foot. He played the cut and hook shots especially well. Nourse was an expert fielder, rated by Wisden as one of the best in world cricket. As vice-captain in 1947, he was Melville's expected successor.

Jack Robertson "surpassed all reasonable anticipations" in 1947 when his aggregate of 2,760 runs was exceeded only by his colleagues Compton and Edrich. Robertson was noted for "elegant strokeplay" and was strong on the back foot, especially his skill in playing the ball off his legs. Wisden saw "a striking resemblance" between Robertson and his Middlesex predecessor J. W. Hearne who was another polished performer adept at shot placement.

Norman Yardley was selected for his successful captaincy of England in 1947 after he succeeded Wally Hammond. Wisden said his appointment as England captain "set a crown upon a cricket career that (always) promised distinction". Yardley was primarily a batsman, noted for "watching the ball carefully and hitting it hard", but Wisden also praised his fielding in all positions and the consistency of length and direction in his bowling.

== Achievements ==
=== Teams ===
Three teams scored more than 600 runs in an innings:

- 706 for 4 – Surrey v Nottinghamshire (Trent Bridge)
- 662 for 8 – Nottinghamshire v Essex (Trent Bridge)
- 637 for 4 – Middlesex v Leicestershire (Leicester)

The lowest innings total of the season was 25 by Somerset against Gloucestershire at Bristol.

=== Batting ===
1947 English cricket season – leading batsmen by average
Name	Innings	Runs	Highest	Average	100s
Denis Compton	50	3,816	246	90.85	18
Bill Edrich	52	3,539	267*	80.43	12
Ted Lester	11	657	142	73.00	3
Cyril Washbrook	47	2,662	251*	68.25	11
Leslie Ames	42	2,272	212*	64.91	7

Of batsmen who played at least ten innings, twelve averaged 50.00 or more.

1947 English cricket season – leading batsmen by aggregate
Name	Innings	Runs	Highest	Average	100s
Denis Compton	50	3,816	246	90.85	18
Bill Edrich	52	3,539	267*	80.43	12
Jack Robertson	57	2,760	229	52.07	12
Cyril Washbrook	47	2,662	251*	68.25	11
Len Hutton	44	2,585	270*	64.62	11

In total, 91 batsmen scored 1,000 runs in the season. Of these, seventeen scored 2,000-plus.

Compton's 3,816 runs and his 18 centuries are records for an English first-class cricket season. Edrich's 3,539 runs is the second highest aggregate of all time in a single season. Compton's two records were previously held by Tom Hayward, who scored 3,518 runs (including 13 centuries) in 1906, and Jack Hobbs, who completed 16 centuries (among 3,024 runs) in 1925.

Between them, the Middlesex trio of Compton, Edrich and Robertson scored 42 centuries in the season but none of them scored two in the same match. This feat was achieved eight times:

- Les Berry (Leicestershire) – 165 and 111 not out versus Essex (Clacton)
- George Emmett (Gloucestershire) – 115 and 103 not out versus Leicestershire (Leicester)
- Len Hutton (Yorkshire) – 197 and 104 versus Essex (Southend)
- Ted Lester (Yorkshire) – 126 and 142 versus Northamptonshire (Northampton)
- Alan Melville (South Africa) – 189 and 104 not out versus England (Trent Bridge)
- Bruce Mitchell (South Africa) – 120 and 189 not out versus England (The Oval)
- Winston Place (Lancashire) – 105 and 132 not out versus Nottinghamshire (Old Trafford)
- Cyril Washbrook (Lancashire) – 176 and 121 not out versus Sussex (Eastbourne)

A total of 26 double-centuries were scored, Bill Edrich and Joe Hardstaff making the most with three each. The highest individual innings was 270 not out by Len Hutton for Yorkshire against Hampshire at Bournemouth.

=== Bowling ===
1947 English cricket season – leading bowlers by average
Name	Balls	Maidens	Runs	Wickets	Average
Johnnie Clay	2,973	126	1,069	65	16.44
Tom Goddard	8,708	344	4,119	238	17.30
Jack Young	7,747	416	2,765	159	17.38
Bill Bowes	4,794	275	1,277	73	17.49
Dick Howorth	7,524	375	2,929	164	17.85

Of bowlers who took fifty or more wickets, twelve achieved an average less than 20.

1947 English cricket season – leading bowlers by aggregate
Name	Balls	Maidens	Runs	Wickets	Average
Tom Goddard	8,708	344	4,119	238	17.30
Doug Wright	7,055	252	3,739	177	21.12
Peter Smith	9,636	287	4,667	172	27.13
Dick Howorth	7,524	375	2,929	164	17.85
Jack Young	7,747	416	2,765	159	17.38

22 players took 100 wickets or more in the season and six of these took over 150 wickets.

There were twelve hat-tricks in the season and six instances of three wickets taken in four balls. Tom Goddard did the hat-trick twice, against Glamorgan at Swansea and Somerset at Bristol, and Doug Wright once, against Sussex at Hastings, which meant that they equalled the world career hat-trick record of six, set by Charlie Parker.

Tom Goddard had the best bowling analysis of the season when he took nine for 41 against Nottinghamshire at Bristol. His colleague Sam Cook was second-best with nine for 42 against Yorkshire, also at Bristol. Three other bowlers — Peter Smith, Len Muncer and Cliff Gladwin — took nine in an innings and there were twelve instances of eight in an innings, including three by Goddard. Goddard took fifteen wickets in a match three times but the best match analysis was sixteen for 215 by Peter Smith for Essex against Middlesex at Colchester. Arthur Wellard and Doug Wright took fifteen wickets in a match once apiece.

=== All-round ===
Three players completed the season "double" of 1,000 runs scored and 100 wickets taken:

- Dick Howorth (Worcestershire) scored 1,510 runs and took 164 wickets, achieving the double on 7 August
- Ray Smith (Essex) – 1,386 runs and 125 wickets (12 August)
- Peter Smith (Essex) – 1,065 runs and 172 wickets (28 August)

=== Fielding and wicketkeeping ===
Five fielders held more than forty catches in the season:

- 48 – Jack Crapp (Gloucestershire; 30 matches)
- 46 – John Langridge (Sussex; 29)
- 43 – Basil Allen (Gloucestershire; 30)
- 41 – Arthur Fagg (Kent; 29)
- 41 – Jack Walsh (Leicestershire; 27)

Four wicketkeepers held more than fifty catches:

- 68 – Godfrey Evans (Kent; 28 matches; 25 st)
- 61 – Leslie Compton (Middlesex; 30 matches; 18 st)
- 53 – Billy Griffith (Sussex; 30 matches; 7 st)
- 51 – Arthur McIntyre (Surrey; 24 matches; 5 st)

Three wicketkeepers completed more than thirty stumpings:

- 40 – Hugo Yarnold (Worcestershire; 31 matches; 48 ct)
- 38 – Tom Wade (Essex; 28 matches; 39 ct)
- 31 – Andy Wilson (Gloucestershire; 29 matches; 32 ct)

Most wicketkeeping victims overall:

- 93 – Godfrey Evans (Kent)
- 88 – Hugo Yarnold (Worcestershire)
- 79 – Leslie Compton (Middlesex)
- 77 – Tom Wade (Essex)
- 63 – Andy Wilson (Gloucestershire)

== Footnote ==
• a) The Wisden Cricketers of the Year for 1947 were announced in the 1948 edition of Wisden Cricketers' Almanack.

== Sources ==
- Playfair Cricket Annual, 1st edition, editor Peter West, Playfair Books, 1948
- Wisden Cricketers' Almanack, 85th edition, editor Hubert Preston, Sporting Handbooks Ltd, 1948
