= South African cricket team in England in 1947 =

International cricket tour

The South African cricket team toured England in the 1947 season to play a five-match Test series against England. The team was captained by Alan Melville with Dudley Nourse as his vice-captain (v/c). England won the series with three wins and two matches drawn. This was the second Test series hosted by England since the end of World War II in 1945. South Africa's previous visit to England was their successful 1935 tour.

== Background ==
1947 was a year in which the weather frequently made headlines in Great Britain. After one of the coldest winters on record, the summer was uncharacteristically warm and sunny. In terms of cricket, what the new Playfair Cricket Annual called a "glorious summer" contrasted sharply with the wet summer of 1946. The country was still recovering from the war with austerity and rationing a fact of daily life, but sporting events were eagerly awaited and drew large attendances.

== South African squad ==
South Africa brought a 17-man squad captained by Alan Melville. Squad details below state the player's age at the beginning of the tour, his batting hand, his type of bowling, and his provincial Currie Cup team at the time:

Batsmen
Name	Currie Cup	Birth date	Batting style	Bowling style	Ref
Alan Melville (captain)	Transvaal	19 May 1910 (aged 36)	right-handed	off break, leg break and googly	
Dudley Nourse (v/c)	Natal	12 November 1910 (aged 36)	right-handed	none	
Denis Begbie	Transvaal	14 December 1914 (aged 32)	right-handed	off break, leg break and googly	
Dennis Dyer	Natal	2 May 1914 (aged 32)	right-handed	slow left-arm orthodox spin	
Tony Harris	Transvaal	27 August 1916 (aged 30)	right-handed	none	
Ken Viljoen	Transvaal	14 May 1910 (aged 36)	right-handed	none	

All-rounders
Name	Currie Cup	Birth date	Batting style	Bowling style	Ref
Ossie Dawson	Natal	1 September 1919 (aged 27)	right-handed	right arm medium pace	
Bruce Mitchell	Transvaal	8 January 1909 (aged 38)	right-handed	leg break	

Wicket-keepers
Name	Currie Cup	Birth date	Batting style	Bowling style	Ref
George Fullerton	Transvaal	8 December 1922 (aged 24)	right-handed	none	
Johnny Lindsay	Transvaal	8 September 1908 (aged 38)	right-handed	none	
Douglas Ovenstone	Western Province	28 December 1920 (aged 26)	right-handed	none	

Bowlers
Name	Currie Cup	Birth date	Batting style	Bowling style	Ref
Tufty Mann	Eastern Province	28 December 1920 (aged 26)	right-handed	slow left-arm orthodox spin	
Leslie Payn	Natal	6 May 1915 (aged 31)	right-handed	slow left-arm orthodox spin	
Jack Plimsoll	Western Province	27 October 1917 (aged 29)	right-handed	left-arm fast bowling medium fast	
Athol Rowan	Transvaal	7 February 1921 (aged 26)	right-handed	off break	
Ian Smith	Natal	25 February 1925 (aged 22)	right-handed	leg break	
Lindsay Tuckett	Orange Free State	6 February 1919 (aged 28)	right-handed	right-arm fast bowling medium fast	

== England selections ==
England chose a total of 21 players to represent them in the series. Five players took part in all five Test matches: captain Norman Yardley; batsmen Len Hutton, Cyril Washbrook and Denis Compton; and wicket-keeper Godfrey Evans.

== Test series summary ==
=== First Test ===
7–11 June 1947
(4-day match)
Scorecard
Wisden

South Africa	v	England
533 (196.3 overs); A. Melville 189, A. D. Nourse 149; W. E. Hollies 5/123 (55.2 overs)		208 (113.1 overs); D. C. S. Compton 65; L. T. D. Tuckett 5/68 (37 overs)
166/1 (51 overs); A. Melville 104*; A. V. Bedser 1/31 (14 overs)		551 (f/o) (226.2 overs); D. C. S. Compton 163; V. I. Smith 4/143 (51 overs)

match drawn
Trent Bridge, Nottingham
Umpires: C. A. R. Coleman and J. A. Smart

- South Africa won the toss and elected to bat
- 8 June was taken as a rest day
- O. C. Dawson, T. A. Harris, A. M. B. Rowan, L. T. D. Tuckett, N. B. F. Mann, J. D. Lindsay and V. I. Smith (all SA), and H. E. Dollery, C. Cook and J. W. Martin (all ENG) made their Test debuts

=== Second Test ===
21–25 June 1947
(4-day match)
Scorecard
Wisden

England	v	South Africa
554/8d (215 overs); D. C. S. Compton 208, W. J. Edrich 189; L. T. D. Tuckett 5/115 (47 overs)		327 (142.2 overs); A. Melville 117; D. V. P. Wright 5/95 (39 overs)
26/0 (12.1 overs); L. Hutton 13*; C. Washbrook 13*		252 (f/o) (127.2 overs); B. Mitchell 80; D. V. P. Wright 5/80 (32.2 overs)

England won by 10 wickets
Lord's, London
Umpires: H. G. Baldwin and D. Davies

- England won the toss and elected to bat
- 22 June was taken as a rest day
- G. H. Pope (ENG) made his Test debut

=== Third Test ===
5–9 July 1947
(4-day match)
Scorecard
Wisden

South Africa	v	England
339 (166.1 overs); K. G. Viljoen 93; W. J. Edrich 4/95 (35.1 overs)		478 (151.3 overs); W. J. Edrich 191, D. C. S. Compton 115; L. T. D. Tuckett 4/148 (50 overs)
267 (84.4 overs); A. D. Nourse 115; W. J. Edrich 4/77 (22.4 overs)		130/3 (36.5 overs); C. Washbrook 40; N. B. F. Mann 2/19 (14 overs)

England won by 7 wickets
Old Trafford, Manchester
Umpires: F. Chester and C. A. R. Coleman

- South Africa won the toss and elected to bat
- 6 July was taken as a rest day
- D. V. Dyer and J. B. Plimsoll (both SA), and K. Cranston and C. Gladwin (both ENG) made their Test debuts

=== Fourth Test ===
26–29 July 1947
(4-day match)
Scorecard
Wisden

South Africa	v	England
175 (97.1 overs); B. Mitchell 53; H. J. Butler 4/34 (28 overs)		317/7d (154 overs); L. Hutton 100; N. B. F. Mann 4/68 (50 overs)
184 (80 overs); A. D. Nourse 57; K. Cranston 4/12 (7 overs)		47/0 (15.4 overs); L. Hutton 32*

England won by 10 wickets
Headingley, Leeds
Umpires: F. Chester and J. J. Hills

- South Africa won the toss and elected to bat.
- 27 July was taken as a rest day; the match was scheduled for four days but completed in three
- G. M. Fullerton (SA), and J. A. Young and H. J. Butler (both ENG) made their Test debuts;
  K. Cranston ended the South African second innings with four wickets in six balls (W.W.WW)

=== Fifth Test ===
16–20 August 1947
(4-day match)
Scorecard
Wisden

England	v	South Africa
427 (190 overs); L. Hutton 83; N. B. F. Mann 4/93 (64 overs)		302 (131 overs); B. Mitchell 120; W. H. Copson 3/46 (27 overs)
325/6d (77 overs); D. C. S. Compton 113; A. M. B. Rowan 3/95 (25 overs)		423/7 (141 overs); B. Mitchell 189*; R. Howorth 3/85 (37 overs)

Match drawn
The Oval, London
Umpires: H. G. Baldwin and J. A. Smart

- England won the toss and elected to bat
- 17 August was taken as a rest day
- J. D. B. Robertson and R. Howorth (both ENG) made their Test debuts

== Bibliography ==
- Playfair. West, Peter (ed.). Playfair Cricket Annual (1st edition) (1948 ed.). London: Playfair Books Ltd.
- Wisden. Preston, Hubert (ed.). Wisden Cricketers' Almanack, 85th edition (1948 ed.). London: John Wisden & Co. Ltd.
