= International cricket in 1948 =

International cricket season

The 1948 International cricket season was from April 1948 to August 1948.

== Season overview ==
International tours
Start date	Home team	Away team	Results [Matches]			
Start date	Home team	Away team	Test	ODI	FC	LA
2 June 1948	England	England Rest	—	—	0–0 [1]	—
10 June 1948	England	Australia	0–4 [5]	—	—	—
24 July 1948	Scotland	Ireland	—	—	0–1 [1]	—
14 August 1948	Netherlands	Marylebone	—	—	0–2 [3]	0–0 [1]
21 August 1948	Ireland	Marylebone	—	—	0–0 [1]	—
25 August 1948	Netherlands	England	—	—	1–1 [3]	—
13 September 1948	Scotland	Australia	—	—	0–2 [2]	—

== June ==
=== Test Trial in England ===
Unofficial Test match
No.	Date	Home captain	Away captain	Venue	Result
Match	2–4 June	Norman Yardley	Ken Cranston	Edgbaston Cricket Ground, Birmingham	Match drawn

=== Australia in England ===
The Ashes Test series
No.	Date	Home captain	Away captain	Venue	Result
Test 299	10–15 June	Norman Yardley	Donald Bradman	Trent Bridge, Nottingham	Australia by 8 wickets
Test 300	24–29 June	Norman Yardley	Donald Bradman	Lord's, London	Australia by 409 runs
Test 301	8–13 July	Norman Yardley	Donald Bradman	Old Trafford Cricket Ground, Manchester	Match drawn
Test 302	22–27 July	Norman Yardley	Donald Bradman	Headingley Cricket Ground, Leeds	Australia by 7 wickets
Test 303	14–18 August	Norman Yardley	Donald Bradman	Kennington Oval, London	Australia by an innings and 149 runs

== July ==
=== Ireland in Scotland ===
First-class Match
No.	Date	Home captain	Away captain	Venue	Result
Match	24–27 July	William Laidlaw	Noel Mahony	Hamilton Crescent, Glasgow	Ireland by 118 runs

== August ==
=== MCC in Netherlands ===
Two-day match series
No.	Date	Home captain	Away captain	Venue	Result
Match 1	14–15 August	Hugo van Manen	Gubby Allen	De Diepput, The Hague	Match drawn
Match 2	17–18 August	Not mentioned	Gubby Allen	Amsterdam	Marylebone by an innings and 37 runs
Match 3	21–22 August	Not mentioned	Gubby Allen	Rood & Wit ground, Bilthoven	Marylebone by 8 wickets
One-day match
No.	Date	Home captain	Away captain	Venue	Result
Match	19 August	Not mentioned	Gubby Allen	Rood & Wit ground, Bilthoven	Match drawn

=== MCC in Ireland ===
Three-day match series
No.	Date	Home captain	Away captain	Venue	Result
Match	21–24 August	Noel Mahony	Tommy Enthoven	Rathmines, Dublin	Match drawn

=== England in Netherlands ===
Two-day match series
No.	Date	Home captain	Away captain	Venue	Result
Match 1	25–26 August	A Stroink	Arthur Brodhurst	Enschede	Match drawn
Match 2	28–29 August	Not mentioned	Arthur Brodhurst	Haarlem	All Holland by 4 wickets
Match 3	31 Aug–1 September	JJ van der Luur	Arthur Brodhurst	De Diepput, The Hague	Free Foresters by 7 wickets

== September ==
=== Australia in Scotland ===
Two-day match series
No.	Date	Home captain	Away captain	Venue	Result
Match 1	13–14 September	William Laidlaw	Donald Bradman	Grange Cricket Club Ground, Edinburgh	Australia an innings and 40 runs
Match 2	17–18 September	William Laidlaw	Donald Bradman	Mannofield Park, Aberdeen	Australia an innings and 87 runs
