= International cricket in 1947 =

International cricket season

The 1947 International cricket season was from April 1947 to August 1947.

== Season overview ==
International tours
| Start date | Home team | Away team | Results [Matches] | | | |
| Start date | Home team | Away team | Test | ODI | FC | LA |
|---|---|---|---|---|---|---|
| 31 May 1947 | Ireland | Scotland | — | — | 0–0 [1] | — |
| 7 June 1947 | England | South Africa | 3–0 [5] | — | — | — |
| 27 August 1947 | Netherlands | England | — | — | 0–1 [1] | 1–1 [2] |

== May ==
=== Scotland in Ireland ===
Three-day Match
| No. | Date | Home captain | Away captain | Venue | Result |
|---|---|---|---|---|---|
| Match | 31 May–3 June | Noel Mahony | William Laidlaw | Mardyke, Cork | Match drawn |

== June ==
=== South Africa in England ===
Test series
| No. | Date | Home captain | Away captain | Venue | Result |
|---|---|---|---|---|---|
| Test 285 | 7–11 June | Norman Yardley | Alan Melville | Trent Bridge, Nottingham | Match drawn |
| Test 286 | 21–25 June | Norman Yardley | Alan Melville | Lord's, London | England by 10 wickets |
| Test 287 | 5–9 July | Norman Yardley | Alan Melville | Old Trafford Cricket Ground, Manchester | England by 7 wickets |
| Test 288 | 26–29 July | Norman Yardley | Alan Melville | Headingley Cricket Ground, Leeds | England by 10 wickets |
| Test 289 | 16–20 August | Norman Yardley | Alan Melville | Kennington Oval, London | Match drawn |

== August ==
=== England in Netherlands ===
One-day match series
| No. | Date | Home captain | Away captain | Venue | Result |
|---|---|---|---|---|---|
| Match 1 | 27 August | Not mentioned | Not mentioned | Enschede | Free Foresters by 20 runs |
| Match 2 | 30 August | Not mentioned | Not mentioned | Haarlem | Netherlands XI by 2 wickets |
Two-day match
| No. | Date | Home captain | Away captain | Venue | Result |
| Match | 2–3 September | Not mentioned | Not mentioned | De Diepput, The Hague | Free Foresters by an innings and 59 runs |
