= International cricket in 1949 =

International cricket season

The 1949 International cricket season was from April 1949 to August 1949.

== Season overview ==
International tours
Start date	Home team	Away team	Results [Matches]			
Start date	Home team	Away team	Test	ODI	FC	LA
11 June 1949	England	New Zealand	0–0 [4]	—	—	—
23 July 1949	Ireland	Scotland	—	—	1–0 [2]	—
22 August 1949	Netherlands	England	—	—	0–1 [3]	—

== June ==
=== New Zealand in England ===
Test series
No.	Date	Home captain	Away captain	Venue	Result
Test 314	11–14 June	George Mann	Walter Hadlee	Headingley Cricket Ground, Leeds	Match drawn
Test 315	25–28 June	George Mann	Walter Hadlee	Lord's, London	Match drawn
Test 316	23–26 July	Freddie Brown	Walter Hadlee	Old Trafford Cricket Ground, Manchester	Match drawn
Test 317	13–16 August	Freddie Brown	Walter Hadlee	Kennington Oval, London	Match drawn

== July ==
=== Scotland in Ireland ===
Two-day Match
No.	Date	Home captain	Away captain	Venue	Result
Match	22–23 August	Noel Mahony	William Laidlaw	Ormeau, Belfast	Ireland by 73 runs

== August ==
=== England in Netherlands ===
Two-day Match
No.	Date	Home captain	Away captain	Venue	Result
Match 1	22–23 August	Not mentioned	Not mentioned	Amsterdam	Match drawn
Match 2	24–25 August	Not mentioned	Not mentioned	Haarlem	Match drawn
Match 2	27–28 August	Hugo van Manen	Not mentioned	De Diepput, The Hague	Free Foresters by 10 wickets
