= Douglas Ovenstone =

South African cricketer

Personal information
- Full name: Douglas MacPherson Ovenstone
- Born: 31 July 1921; Sea Point, Cape Province, South Africa
- Died: 6 November 2011 (aged 90); Llandudno, Cape Town, Cape Province, South Africa
- Batting: Right-handed
- Role: Wicketkeeper

Domestic team information
- Years: Team
- 1946/47–1947/48: Western Province
- First-class debut: 13 March 1943 First South African Division v The Rest
- Last First-class: 3 January 1948 Western Province v Transvaal

Career statistics
Competition	FC
Matches	20
Runs scored	437
Batting average	14.56
100s/50s	–/1
Top score	52
Balls bowled	–
Wickets	–
Bowling average	–
5 wickets in innings	–
10 wickets in match	–
Best bowling	–
Catches/stumpings	40/15
- Source: CricketArchive, 4 March 2012

Douglas MacPherson Ovenstone (31 July 1921 – 6 November 2011) was a South African cricketer who played first-class cricket between 1942–43 and 1947–48. He was born at Sea Point, Cape Town, Cape Province and died at Llandudno, Cape Town.

Ovenstone was a right-handed batsman who mainly batted in the lower order but was occasionally used as an opener, and a wicketkeeper. He played in a single wartime first-class match, having served in the South African forces in the Second World War and been wounded at El Alamein.

He played regularly for Western Province in 1946-47 and in the match against Transvaal he hit 52 while opening the batting; this was to be his only first-class score of more than 50. On the strength of that and four catches in the Transvaal second innings, he was picked for the 1947 South African tour of England. With Johnny Lindsay and George Fullerton also on the touring side, Ovenstone's opportunities were limited. Lindsay was chosen for the first three Test matches and though his poor batting meant that he then lost his Test place, Ovenstone was not available, as he was sidelined for two months after breaking a finger in a county game immediately after the second Test; by the time he was fit again, the tour was almost over and Fullerton had taken over as the Test wicketkeeper.

Ovenstone returned to first-class cricket with Western Province in the 1947–48 season, but then retired to a career in business. He ran a farm in the Western Cape that housed exotic animals and had interests in a family fisheries business.
