= Jack Papworth (band) =

- Born: Australia
- Died: December 2003
- Occupations: musician; songwriter
- Instrument: vocals
- Years active: 1950s–2000s

Jack Papworth was an Australian musician who fronted Jack Papworth and His Orchestra. The group were an Australian dance band formed in the 1950s. The group's compilation album, Old Time Dance Band, peaked at number 41 on the Australian charts in 1980.

== History ==
Papworth was born in Singleton, the fourth of nine children. The family moved to Newcastle when he was eight. His father, a trombonist in the Newcastle steelworks band, soon discovered his son's interest in music and sold his own instrument to buy a cornet for Jack, teaching him at home.

Papworth became a fixture in bands around Newcastle at 13 performing in his school band, a combined school band and the Newcastle C-grade and A-grade bands. Papworth left school at 14 to take up an apprenticeship as a glass beveler but five years later was laid off because of the Depression. To earn a living, Papworth played trumpet in a dance band, had a mobile lending library which traveled the Hunter region, and provided background music for silent movies at the Lambton theatre. One of his skills was accompanying himself on the piano with his left hand while playing the trumpet with his right.

Papworth joined Phil Furley's dance band in Newcastle. Furley, an Englishman with what was dubbed a "golden voice", was a radio announcer who promoted dance music on 2HD in Newcastle. In 1956 2UE began regular broadcasts of dance music from various venues throughout Sydney. For 12 years the music was recorded at dances on Friday night and was played through more than 50 stations on the eastern seaboard on Sunday night. The 11-piece Jack Papworth band was renowned for its music, with between 500 and 700 dancers crowding the floor every Friday night.

The Jack Papworthand His Orchestra band played at the Kogarah RSL from 1961 to 1998 and at the Blacktown Workers club, for 30 years.

== Discography ==
=== Albums ===
List of albums, with Australian chart positions
Title	Album details	Peak chart positions
Title	Album details	AUS
Old Time Dance Night	Released: 1972; Format: LP; Label: EMI Music (SOEX 9957)	-
Old Time Dance Band	Released: 1981; Format: LP; Label: J&B Records (JB062)	41
