= William Laidlaw =

William Laidlaw may refer to:

- William Laidlaw (poet) (1780–1845), Scottish poet
- William G. Laidlaw (1840–1908), American politician
- William Laidlaw (cricketer) (1912–1992), Scottish cricketer
- Bill Laidlaw (1914–1941), Scottish golfer
