= Ted Lester =

English cricketer

Personal information
- Full name: Edward Ibson Lester
- Born: 18 February 1923; Scarborough, Yorkshire, England
- Died: 23 March 2015 (aged 92); Scarborough, Yorkshire, England
- Batting: Right-handed
- Bowling: Right arm off break
- Role: Middle-order batsman, later Yorkshire Scorer

Domestic team information
- Years: Team
- 1945–1964: Yorkshire

Career statistics
Competition	First-class	List A
Matches	232	1
Runs scored	10,912	0
Batting average	34.20	0.00
100s/50s	25/50	0/0
Top score	186	0
Balls bowled	330	–
Wickets	3	–
Bowling average	53.33	–
5 wickets in innings	0	–
10 wickets in match	0	n/a
Best bowling	1/7	–
Catches/stumpings	108/–	0/–
- Source: CricketArchive, 20 February 2009

Edward Ibson Lester (18 February 1923 – 23 March 2015) was an English first-class cricketer who played for Yorkshire County Cricket Club. He was born and died at Scarborough, Yorkshire, England.

Lester had a first-class cricket career lasting from 1945 to 1956 for Yorkshire, but remained a significant influence in the county cricket club's fortunes as Scorer and committee man. He made his debut as an amateur right-handed middle-order batsman immediately after World War II, and in 1947 he made three centuries in eleven innings, which left him third in the English national averages behind Denis Compton and Bill Edrich in their year of unparalleled success.

For 1948, Lester joined the Yorkshire staff, and for next seven seasons he made more than 1,000 runs each year except 1951. His best years were 1949, when he scored 1,801 runs, and 1952 when, with 1,786 at an average little short of 50 runs an innings, he was fourth in the national averages. After further good seasons in 1953 and 1954, though, his batting fell away badly in 1955, and at the end of July he was dropped from the first team. Apart from one match against Scotland in 1956, he never regained his place.

Lester continued, however, to play for Yorkshire's Second XI for the next six seasons, often captaining the side and acting as the senior player alongside the younger players, including John Hampshire, Geoffrey Boycott, Philip Sharpe and Brian Bolus. There was a brief codicil to his playing career: in 1964, John Hampshire fell ill just before the Gillette Cup one day match against Middlesex at Lord's and Lester, acting as scorer, was drafted into the side. But Yorkshire lost and Lester, batting at number nine, failed to score.

Lester also played football as a goalkeeper for Scarborough F.C.

Thereafter, he became Yorkshire's regular scorer until his retirement in 1988. He was an often forthright champion against what he perceived as the undeserved neglect of the scorer's role in cricket competitions.
