= Des Hoysted =

Australian racecaller

Des Hoysted (1923 – 25 March 2010) was an Australian radio broadcaster and horse racing identity. He was a racecaller for 51 years in what is widely regarded as the golden era of the Australian turf.

Hoysted called his first race on Boxing Day in 1948 at Wodonga, Victoria, and then joined the ABC in Melbourne as an understudy to Joe Brown. He moved to 2GB in 1952, but made his mark in 1959 when he joined 2UE. He called 20 Melbourne Cups for 2UE and only finished there when the radio station ceased broadcasting the races in 1983.

For many years, Hoysted continued to work around Sydney racetracks, mainly as a broadcast advisor, bon vivant, and tent tipper. He unofficially retired from the track in 2001.

He died at the age of 87, on 25 March 2010 in a Sydney nursing home, survived by his wife, Pat, and children Raymond and Joanne.
