= 2UE =

Commercial radio station in Sydney, Australia

Coordinates: 33.8542°S 151.0650°E

- Sydney; Australia
- Frequency: 954 kHz
- Branding: Classic Hits 2UE

Programming
- Format: Oldies; Classic hits

Ownership
- Owner: Tapt Media; (Radio 2UE Sydney Pty Ltd)
- Operator: Ace Radio
- Sister stations: 4BH; Magic 1278

History
- First air date: 26 January 1925; 101 years ago (as 2UE)
- Former call signs: 2EU
- Former frequencies: 1025 kHz (1925–1935); 950 kHz (1935–1978)
- Call sign meaning: Reversal of founding owner name Electrical Utilities, 2 for New South Wales

Technical information
- Licensing authority: ACMA
- Power: 5 kW

Links
- Public licence information: Profile
- Webcast: iHeartRadio stream
- Website: 2ue.com.au

2UE is an all-music radio station in Sydney owned by Tapt Media and run under a lease agreement by Ace Radio. It currently broadcasts from its studios in Pyrmont, New South Wales.

== History ==
=== 1920s ===
==== 2EU ====
Electrical Utilities applied to the Postmaster-General's Department for a licence for a new B Class (later commercial) station licence. The station was to have the call-sign 2EU, based on the initials of Electrical Utilities. However, before the licence, PMG – Broadcasting Station Licence No.12, was issued on 7 November 1924, Electrical Utilities advised the PMG that it wished to reverse the initials in the call-sign – thus the licence was issued to 2UE. As to the reason for the change of call-sign, Jim Malone, Chief Manager of Telegraphs and Wireless for the Federal Government, suggested the change saying that 2UE had a "more euphonious sound".

==== 2UE ====
2UE opened on 26 January 1925. The founder of Electrical Utilities and 2EU/2UE was Cecil "Pa" Stevenson, who was also 2UE's chief engineer, and one of the most prominent personalities in Australia's early broadcasting history. Prior to opening 2UE, he had operated experimental station 2IY, as well as working alongside a couple of other early experimenters.

Pa Stevenson was assisted at 2UE by his family, and in particular by his eldest son, Murray. Murray Stevenson claimed that he was chiefly responsible for the technical side of the station. Pa Stevenson was the first announcer.

The original studio was in the dining room of the Stevenson Maroubra home; and an 80 feet (24.384 metres) transmitting tower was installed in his back yard. All the equipment was homemade; the studio and equipment costing £750 ($1,500) to build, and £9 ($18) per week to operate. Within a short time the studios were moved to Stevenson's radio store in George Street, Sydney.

Most programming was provided by 78 rpm recordings or player piano rolls. It is reputed that whilst changing records or rolls, Stevenson would whistle so as to prevent dead air. 2UE was originally on the air daily from 8.00 pm to 10.00 pm. The station is reputed to have broadcast Australia's first radio advertisement. A local butcher was so disconcerted with the sounds between recordings and piano rolls that he paid Stevenson one shilling (10¢) to substitute his whistling with short talks about the quality of the butcher's meat. One shilling then became the station's standard advertising rate. Another early advertiser was Youth-O-Form slimming tablets. A spokesperson for the manufacturer claimed: "each morning after we aired the spots there would be long queues outside the shop at Roseberry.

There are records of early 2UE broadcasts being picked up in the US and New Zealand.

2UE is the oldest current commercial radio station in Australia.

In 1929, through Cecil Stevenson, 2UE experimented with sending pictures by radio using radiovision or mechanical television. The experiments were short-lived due to the lack of receivers to pick up the transmissions. (Melbourne stations 3UZ and 3DB also both conducted similar experimental transmissions in 1929.)

=== 1930s ===
==== Broadcast Services Association ====
As a cost saving measure in the depths of the Great Depression, in December 1935 it was announced that an organisation to be known as Broadcasting Service Association, Limited, would co-ordinate and provide combined production resources for 2UE and 2GB, but without owning or operating either station. On 7 January 1937, it was announced that the two stations would operate as the Red Network and the Blue Network; a concept which was copied from the US's NBC network, which operated a Red Network and Blue Network at this time. However, the concept never transpired in Australia, because in February 2GB announced that it was going to form its own national network, and that eventually led to the formation of the Macquarie Network in 1938 which was at first jointly managed by 2GB and 2UE.

==== Major Broadcasting Network ====
In 1938 2UE and 3DB Melbourne launched the Major Broadcasting Network which for many decades was Australia's second most important radio network, after the Macquarie Network. The main person behind the formation of the Major Network was David Worrall, manager of 3DB, and a most important figure in broadcasting history.

The Major Network's Sydney outlet later changed from 2UE to 2CH and then to 2UW before 2UE yet again became the Major Network outlet in Sydney in September 1950. The Network broadcast a wide range of live variety programs including quizzes and dramas including soap operas, mostly emanating from the 3DB or 2UE studios.

The formation of the Major Network actually happened after two earlier attempts by David Worrall to form a network with 2UE as the Sydney station. In 1933, a loose grouping, but the first Australian attempt to form a commercial network, was attempted, known as the Federal Network. Then, in 1933 the Associated Broadcasters of Australia was formed but, again, did not last long.

==== Accommodation ====
In 1938 2UE and 2GB, as partners in the newly formed Broadcast Services Association moved their studios and offices to Savoy House, 29 Bligh Street, Sydney, with 2UE on the 4th and 5th floors and 2GB on the 6th and 7th floors.

In 1930 a new transmitter was installed at Lilli Pilli.

==== Ownership ====
In 1933–34 Pa Stevenson sold the station to Associated Newspapers Ltd, publishers of The Sun. However, the Stevenson family, particularly Murray Stevenson, continued to have an influence at the station.

==== Time signal ====
In 1938 the station was commencing its broadcasts at 6.00 am with The Alarm Clock.

From 1939, 2UE became the first Australian station to broadcast six pips from the Australian observatory as an hourly time signal. For many decades all Australian stations carried the six pip time signal first heard on 2UE, and many stations continued to provide this service until the service was switched off in October 2019.

==== Drama ====
The 2UE Dramatic Players were established in the 1930s providing a number of dramas and serials on a repertory basis. The Players were led by George Edwards, arguably the most prominent radio actor and producer of the time. Some time later, Paul Jacklin was appointed 2UE's head of production. Malcolm "Max" Afford also played an important role in 2UE's dramatic productions in the 1930s and into the 1940s. Right up to the early 1960s 2UE was to produce many dozens of audio plays for the Major Broadcasting Network. These mainly consisted of 15-minute serials or soap operas and 30-minute dramas. However, probably the most important dramatic production to emanate from the 2UE studios was the Australian version of the Lux Radio Theatre which was heard at 8.00 pm every Sunday evening until 1952 – in pre-television days, arguably the most listened-to hour in the week for any radio station. (For much of its time on air, the Lux Radio Theatre was in competition with 2GB's Macquarie Radio Theatre later known as the Caltex Theatre.)

==== Live music ====
2UE transmitted many live musical broadcasts during this era. These ranged from classical to pop. The importance of these types of programming at that time, is highlighted by the fact that in 1933 the 2UE Academy of Music was formed under Rex Shaw and Professor Clarence Elkin, so as to train singers and instrumentalists, particularly in the classical field. However, the Academy only lasted about a year.

==== Cricket / Don Bradman ====
In the 1930s, Test Cricket had a particularly high profile and most capital city radio stations, both the ABC and commercial stations, used the cricket as a vehicle for competitive programming, often interspersing live variety programs with news of the ongoing match supplied by overseas cablegrams. In 1931 a Sydney menswear store arranged for Don Bradman to broadcast twice weekly during the cricket season. He was on a two-year contract at the very high sum of £1,000 a year; a deal which is credited with keeping Bradman in Australia.

Bradman also regularly played the piano during 2UE's weekly Call to Youth program.

==== World War II ====
On 3 September 1939 2UE was broadcasting a radio drama in the Lux Radio Theatre series when the performance of Leah Kleschna was interrupted by the voice of the Prime Minister, Robert Menzies announcing that Australia was now at war with Germany.

Censorship was rife during the war, particularly after the U.S. entered the conflict on 7 December 1941. After General Douglas MacArthur set up his headquarters in Australia, he wielded enormous power, including on matters of censorship. Inter-alia, he declared that every Australian radio station would only broadcast three news bulletins per day and that these would be simultaneous at 7.45 am, midday and 7.00 pm. Weather forecasts were banned because it was felt that this may assist the enemy.

Notices were issued banning radio stations from broadcasting some major wartime events, but as the federal government did not have the same power over the printed press as it did over radio, newspapers usually reported events that radio was not permitted to mention.

There was some talk of closing down all commercial radio stations, as the enemy could beam-in on the transmitters and use these as bombing targets. As it transpired, this did not happen. However, some stations (not 2UE) were closed down for 24 hours as punishment for perceivably ignoring bans on radio reporting particular news items.

Many sponsors donated their advertising time to patriotic appeals.

2UE was also badly affected by staff enlisting. 2UE personality Frank Bennett became a broadcaster at 9AP Labuan, Borneo. Arthur Pettet, an engineer at 2UE, became the Chief Engineer at 9AD, Morotai, Dutch East Indies. Bennett and Pettet were only two of dozens of radio personnel who took up positions at the 20 Australian military radio stations throughout the Pacific.

The supply of overseas programs was virtually cut off during the war, particularly from the U.S., meaning that Australian stations had to produce more local programs; this was the case at 2UE.

=== 1940s ===
==== Accommodation ====
In July 1941 Prime Minister Robert Menzies officially opened a new 1,000 watt transmitter at Concord. The transmitter tower was wired with explosives by the army, so that an enemy could not have used it, should there have been a World War II invasion.

Fire destroyed the Savoy House studios in 1943, and another Sydney station, 2CH, gave 2UE temporary accommodation in their own studio complex.

==== Horse racing ====
2UE was well known over many decades for its coverage of races, both in Sydney and, through relays, of meetings throughout Australia. It also relayed Sydney races both through Major Broadcasting Network affiliates and through other stations. The 2UE racing service commenced in 1945 when Sports Editor Clif Cary, already well known for his cricket broadcasts, started a service then known as the Associated Sports Broadcasts which relayed horse racing and other Saturday afternoon sporting events to nine other N.S.W. stations. The racing service ended in 1983 when Des Hoysted called the last race to be broadcast by 2UE. The long list of 2UE race-callers included Clif Cary, Ken Howard, Des Hoysted, Andrew Martin and Harry Solomons.

=== 1950s ===
==== Promotional slogan ====
During this era, 2UE was known as The Modern Station.

==== Sale ====
In 1954 John Lamb purchased 2UE from Associated Newspapers, for £165,000 ($330,000). Lamb also owned 2KO Newcastle, New South Wales. John Lamb died in 1978, and his son, Stewart, moved from Newcastle to Sydney to look after the Lamb family's interests in 2UE.

==== Gary O'Callaghan ====
Gary O'Callaghan was Sydney's number one breakfast announcer for 28 years, winning 159 surveys.

==== Top 40 ====
2UE instigated Australia's first Top 40 on 2 March 1958, with former Newcastle announcer Pat Barton as the host of a daily Top 40 program. The number one song on the very first Top 40 chart was Pat Boone's April Love.

=== 1960s ===
==== New promotional slogan ====
During the 1960s, the station was known as The Brighter 2UE.

==== Sydney's Pop Music station ====
In the early 1960s, 2UE dropped virtually all of its variety and drama shows. It was considered that television had become the home for these types of programming. 2UE increased its reliance on a Top 40 format, becoming one of the first stations in Australia to devote most of its air time to pop music, but by the end of this decade 2SM had superseded 2UE as Sydney's most popular Top 40 station.

Popular 2UE DJs in this era included Bob Rogers, Tony Withers and John Laws.

Commencing in 1966, a major pop music promotion on 2UE Sydney and 3UZ Melbourne was Hoadley's Battle of the Sounds, a national rock band concert staged to promote Australian talent and foster new bands. However, after a few years, 2SM was appointed the Sydney outlet for the Battle of the Sounds, replacing 2UE.

One popular variety program that did survive for many years was the National Old Time Dance with Jack Papworth's orchestra, every Friday evening. It was relayed to stations across Australia. At one stage it was broadcast from The Albert Palais, Leichhardt.

==== Talkback ====
Until 1967 talkback was illegal in Australia because of government concerns that: a) people may say something they shouldn't; and b) callers may not know they were on the air. Nevertheless, many stations, particularly 2UW in Sydney and 3AK Melbourne, did broadcast talkback from 1963. However, 2UE and 3DB (Melbourne) were the first Australian stations to legally present talkback, commencing on 17 April 1967. Journalist Ormsby Wilkins was the first 2UE talkback host.

=== 1970s ===
==== Country music ====
Although 2UE was mainly broadcasting Top 40 during this period, in the early 1970s it also featured some country music, including programs hosted by Studio Manager Nick Erby. John Laws also included a deal of country music in his programs.

=== 1980s ===
==== Ownership changes ====
The Lamb family sold 2UE to Kerry Packer in the 1980s, and Packer then sold it to Alan Bond but when the Bond Empire was crumbling in the early 1990s, the Lamb family was to buy back 2UE.

==== CBC Network ====
In 1986, under Kerry Packer, 2UE and 3AK Melbourne, embarked on a shared talk-back format called the CBC Network which featured selected Melbourne and Sydney based programs being broadcast across both stations. Two separate breakfast programs were broadcast for both Sydney and Melbourne but that was the only shift with separate programming. All other programs, whether emanating from Sydney or Melbourne, were heard over both stations. Well-known Sydney and Melbourne news broadcaster and radio management expert Brian White managed both stations. However, the CBC experiment was a short-lived failure.

==== Phillip Adams ====
In the late 1980s, Phillip Adams broadcast a commentary program, ranging from serious news analysis to tongue-in-cheek content. After leaving 2UE in the early 1990s, Adams began a similar program on ABC Radio National and Radio Australia. The ABC program is still being broadcast in 2022, after a life of about 30 years.

==== Huge prize ====
In 1984, 2UE ran a competition, Millionaire Mania, in which a prize of $20,000 a year for 50 years, was offered. This was believed to be the largest-ever radio prize to that date. 2UE management was no doubt relieved when Premier Neville Wran drew out the name of someone described as an "older lady".

=== 1990s ===
==== Cash for comment ====
2UE was the centre of the cash for comment affair, an Australian scandal that broke in 1999. It concerned paid advertising on talk back radio that was presented to the audience in such a way as to sound like editorial commentary. The affair was first reported on the ABC program Media Watch by reporters Richard Ackland, Deborah Richards and Ann Connelly. They revealed that 2UE hosts John Laws and Alan Jones had been paid to give favourable comment to companies including Qantas, Optus, Foxtel, Mirvac and major Australian banks, without disclosing this arrangement to listeners. The Australian Broadcasting Authority found that John Laws, Alan Jones, and 2UE had committed 90 breaches of the industry code and five breaches of 2UE's license conditions. 2UE was fined $360,000 for John Laws's improper conduct.

=== 2000–2016 ===
==== News talk ====
2UE continued to broadcast a news talk format, involving current affairs oriented programs with talkback across the day and more relaxed programming at nights and on weekends. News updates were broadcast at the top of every hour, provided by Macquarie Radio Network.

==== More ownership changes ====
In March 2001, the Lamb family sold 2UE and 4BC to Southern Cross Broadcasting for a reputed $90 million.

In July 2007, Fairfax Media purchased all of Southern Cross Broadcasting's metro radio assets, including 2UE, 3AW and 4BC.

On 22 December 2014, it was announced that Fairfax's radio division and Macquarie Radio Network would merge. The merger was finalised on 1 April 2015.

Despite having had a strong relationship in the 1930s through the Broadcast Services Association, by the 21st century 2UE had been a constant rival of 2GB for many decades. Both of these Sydney stations had offered a similar format. In the early 2010s 2UE slipped badly in the ratings, suffering major blows when long time breakfast program host Alan Jones moved across to the 2GB breakfast program and when broadcaster John Laws retired from radio, leaving his 2UE morning program at the end of 2007.

On 9 April 2015, with 2UE and 2GB now both owned by the newly merged Macquarie Radio Network, the 2UE newsroom was closed after 90 years with the last news report being broadcast at 6 pm that day. The news teams of both stations were merged with "significant job cuts."

==== Station ratings and market position ====
In the eighth and final ratings survey for 2013, released on 10 December 2013, overall 2UE scored a 4.2% market share well behind market leader 2GB on 13.3 which was ahead of next placed ABC702 on 10.4. This rating placed 2UE tenth out of the 14 surveyed stations. During this survey period, its Monday to Friday share slipped to 3.2 per cent of the available audience, putting it behind Macquarie Radio Network's 2CH which averaged 4.6 per cent and meant 2UE was only ahead of three stations. The 2UE drive show slipping a further 0.7 points after the firing of Jason Morrison in the middle of the survey, and evenings slipping further losing 2.6 points, its biggest drop in the survey.

==== Cricket ====
On 1 November 2013, 2UE's parent company, Fairfax Radio Network (FRN), announced that it had signed a five-year contract commencing with the 2013/2014 Australian cricket season, to broadcast the Boxing Day and Sydney Test matches, all One Day Internationals, the Big Bash League (BBL) and International T20 matches on network stations including 2UE. Subsequently, in December 2013, FRN decided on an earlier start to their coverage by including the Perth test match which commenced on 13 December 2013. Fairfax stated that "Fairfax Radio Network will bring to its coverage more than 60 years' experience of broadcasting sport, assembling a star-studded commentary line up". The coverage provided a ball-by-ball commentary of all broadcast matches.

The commentary team was anchored by Tim Lane and Bruce Eva, together with a panel consisting of the following experts

- Ian Chappell
- Allan Border
- Dean Jones
- Damien Fleming
- Michael Vaughan
- Henry Blofeld
- Greg Blewett
- Mickey Arthur
- Darren Lehmann
- Greg Matthews

==== Controversy ====
A number of parties have attempted to sue 2UE for defamation. In February 2012 Mamdouh Habib won his claim and was awarded almost $150,000. 2UE was found to have defamed journalist Ray Chesterton in an August 2005 broadcast made by John Laws.

=== 2016–2018: Talking Lifestyle ===
In September 2016, 2UE relaunched with new branding and programming, moving away from its news talk position to a lifestyle format.

On Monday 27 February 2017, Macquarie Radio Network also launched the Talking Lifestyle format in Melbourne and Brisbane (Talking Lifestyle 1278 and Talking Lifestyle 882). Presenters broadcast from either Sydney or Melbourne.

As of August 2017, weekday presenters were:

- Overnight with David Prior
- Breakfast with John Stanley and Garry Linnell
- Mornings with Tim Webster
- Afternoons with Ed Phillips
- Finance with Peter Switzer
- Drive with Nick Bennett and Kayley Harris
- Technology with Trevor Long
- Late night with Jonathan Coleman
- Second Career with Matthew Tukaki

=== 2018–2020 ===
==== Macquarie Sports Radio ====
On Wednesday 4 April 2018, the three Talking Lifestyle branded stations relaunched with a new sports radio format under the name Macquarie Sports Radio with coverage of the 2018 Commonwealth Games.

A significant number of existing presenters did not return for the new format.

The change of the station was not received well by many fans of the former Talking Lifestyle station. There were even a number of recommendations about switching to the alternative talk station ABC Radio Sydney.

Macquarie Sports Radio 954 was the home of Sydney Swans and Greater Western Sydney Giants matches, as well as other selected AFL matches broadcast from 3AW, as well as the early Friday night NRL Game from NRL Nation.

On 29 October 2019, Macquarie Media announced that its sports talk shows would cease production from 1 November 2019. However, the station continued to broadcast live Test, Big Bash League and One Day International cricket matches during the summer months, as well as coverage of the English Premier League.

=== 2020s ===
==== Switch to all-music format ====
On 21 January 2020, Nine announced the Macquarie Sports Radio brand would be abandoned and 2UE – along with its interstate sister stations Magic 1278 Melbourne and 4BH Brisbane – would return to an all-music format "built around the best of the ''50s, '60s and '70s" with a "soft launch" on 2 February 2020. In April, Steve Jacobs was announced as the station's latest breakfast presenter, commencing on 27 April. All contracts with the sports leagues would be honoured, and the network has not ruled out sports broadcasts in the future.

==== ACE Radio Operations ====
On 28 October 2021, Nine Radio and ACE Radio entered into a deal for ACE to manage the radio station, along with sister stations Magic 1278 and 4BH from early 2022. Ace Radio took control of the station on 14 January 2022. The station relaunched with a new presenter line-up, logo and imaging on this date.

In 2024, 2UE's presenters included the following: Trevor Sinclair, Gareth McCray, Cathy Jubb, Greg Allen and Dave Ferguson. On January 26, 2025, 2UE celebrated its 100th anniversary, coinciding with Australia Day. Its format was changed from easy listening to classic hits, with more upbeat and newer music, and the new lineup of presenters included Gavin Miller and Scott Menz from the other ACE Radio stations.
