= Trevor Sinclair (radio presenter) =

Australian radio presenter

Trevor Sinclair is a Sydney-based radio host. He began his Sydney radio career in 1978 at the then most popular commercial music station in the city 2SM. Prior to this he had worked on provincial radio in New South Wales and the Australian Capital Territory.

== Career ==
=== 20th century ===
Sinclair's career began in the small town of Young on 25 October 1976 for 2LF. He moved to the regional town of Nowra in 1977 to work at 2ST, before hosting a night show, at Canberra's 2CC in early 1978. Sinclair also hosted a very successful late afternoon TV show, "Connections" on local television station CTC-7 from 13 April until 24 November 1978. He was offered a position at Sydney's 2SM in late October 1978 and soon after took over the afternoon role.

In November 1979, Sinclair joined former 2SM colleagues including: Ron E Sparks (Program Director) and Gordon O'Byrne (Presenter) for the rebirth of Sydney station 2UW that was then owned by the Albert family who owned radio stations in Sydney, Melbourne and Brisbane which became known as the Australian Radio Network (ARN). Sinclair continued his association with the Network through its AM stations in Sydney (2UW) and Melbourne (3KZ) conversion to the FM band (Sydney's Mix 106.5 and Melbourne's TT FM) until May 2001.

Sinclair was host of several nationally syndicated radio shows during the 1980s and 1990s for Grace Gibson Radio Productions and ARNSAT including The Hitfile, Music Over Australia and How it was-When it was.

=== 21st century ===
Following a take-over and sale of ARN to Australian Provincial Newspapers and America's Clear Channel Communications, Sinclair found himself back in the regional radio market working for DMG Radio Australia. He presented on DMG's River 94.9 in the summer of 2002. DMG also had recently launched Nova across the country. Nova sold off its regional assets to enable it to buy two new radio licences in Sydney and Melbourne, Sinclair was again back in Sydney at the newly launched Vega 95.3. He hosted the network's night show during 2007 on Sydney's Vega 95.3 and Melbourne's Vega 91.5, followed by autonomous shows in both Sydney and Melbourne from time to time from 2005 until 2009.

Until April 2012, he was hosting the drive show on 2CH in Sydney before moving into a breakfast show support role.

In 2013, Sinclair was appointed Executive Producer/Anchor of the Better Homes & Gardens Radio Show, heard on 70 stations across Australia.

For 12 years, Sinclair was also the host of "FMQ - on Radio Q" on Qantas.

In March 2017, following the sale of 2CH by Macquarie Radio Network to a consortium of Oceania Capital Partners, Glenn Wheatley and John Williams, and the launch of its Easy Classics format, Sinclair once again found himself at 2CH where he hosted the Breakfast Show with Indira Naidoo from April 2018 until December 2019. In January 2020 he moved to host the Afternoon-Drive Show.

Sinclair left 2CH in July 2021 and joined 3MP in Melbourne, owned by Ace Radio, as its evening presenter. In January 2022, Ace took over operation of metropolitan radio stations in Sydney, Brisbane and Melbourne. Sinclair was appointed breakfast show host of two of Ace's music stations: 2UE in Sydney and 4BH in Brisbane. On 11 July 2022, he was replaced on 4BH by Bob Gallagher. As at February 2026, he was hosting weekends on 2UE.
