= 2CH =

- Sydney; Australia
- Frequency: DAB+ Sydney 2
- Branding: Classic Hits 2CH

Programming
- Format: Classic Hits

Ownership
- Owner: Sports Entertainment Network; (Radio 2CH Pty Ltd)

History
- First air date: 15 February 1932
- Last air date: 6 October 2022
- Former frequencies: 1210 kHz AM (1932–1935); 1190 kHz (1935-1952); 1170 kHz AM (1952–2020)
- Call sign meaning: Council of Churches

Technical information
- Power: 5 kW

Links
- Website: www.2ch.com.au

2CH was a commercial radio station in Sydney, Australia which aired from 1932 to 2022. It was latterly owned by Sports Entertainment Network.

== History ==
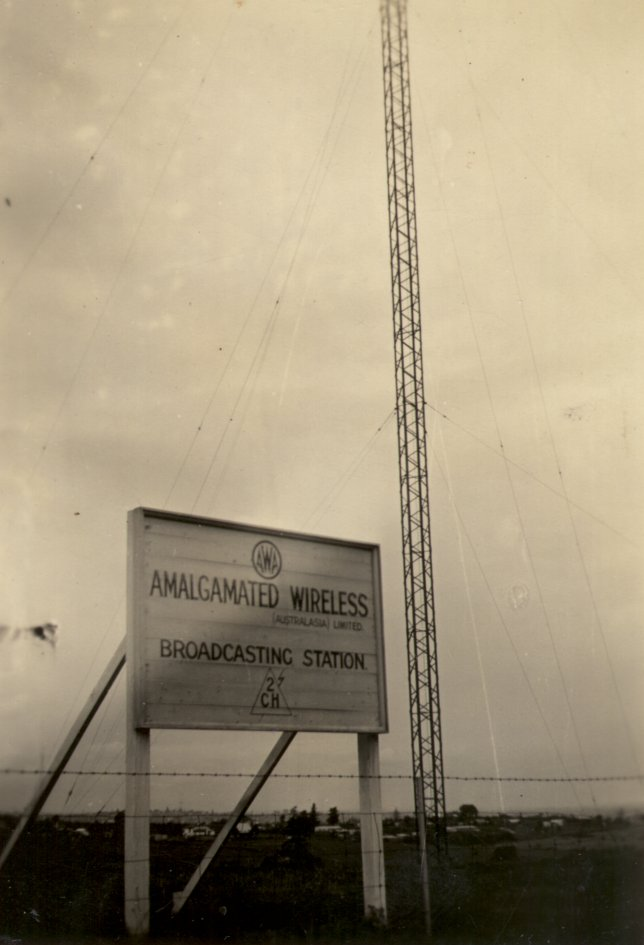
The old 2CH transmitter in Ermington

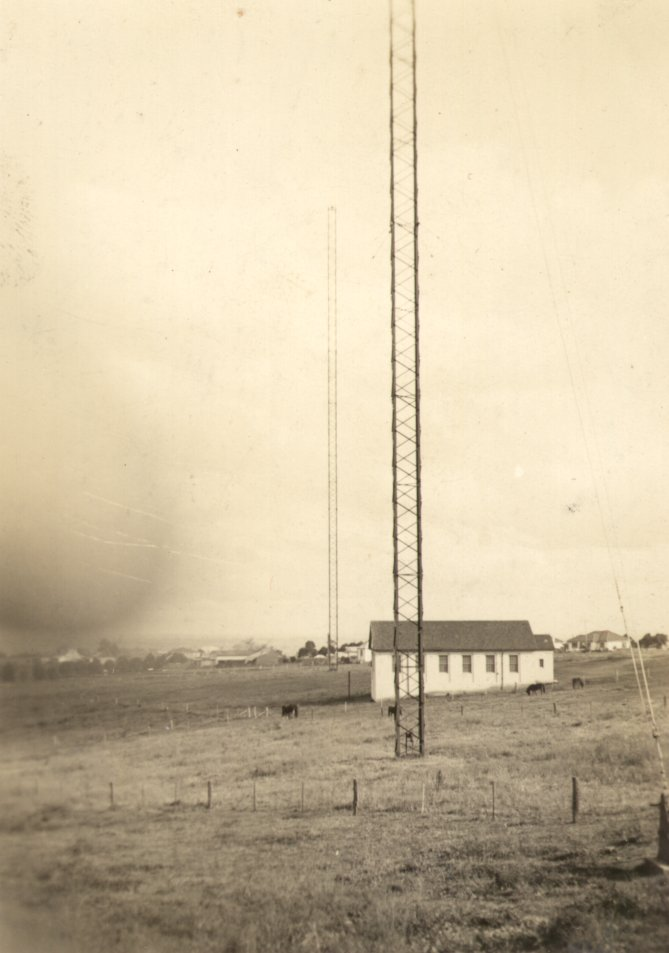
The old 2CH transmitter

2CH commenced broadcasting on 15 February 1932 on 1210 kHz. It moved to 1190 kHz in September 1935, then 1170 kHz in 1952.

=== Ownership ===
The CH stands for "churches". In 1944, the NSW Council of Churches sub-let the licence to AWA who provided program content for six days per week, with the Council of Churches being responsible for programming on Sundays. By 1991, MLC had a 74% shareholding. It was sold to John Singleton in April 1994 becoming part of the Macquarie Radio Network. In June 2003, its studios moved from Sussex Street to Pyrmont.

In January 2017, 2CH was sold to a consortium of Oceania Capital Partners, Glenn Wheatley and John Williams for $5.6 million. The station had to be sold to comply with an undertaking given to the Australian Communications & Media Authority following the merger of the Macquarie Radio Network and Fairfax Media (owners of 2GB and 2UE respectively) to comply with legislation allowing one party to only control two radio stations in a market.

The station posted a loss of $1.9 million on revenue of $2.4 million for the year to March 2019. In June 2020, it was sold for $11 million to Sports Entertainment Network.

=== Church thanksgiving ===
On 18 February 2007, a thanksgiving service to celebrate 2CH's 75 years of broadcasting was held at St Andrew's Anglican Cathedral commencing at 2 pm. The Reverend Peter Jensen, the Anglican Archbishop of Sydney presided with Rev. Dr. Ross Clifford preaching.

=== Transition to 'DAB+ only' radio station and final end ===
In August 2020 after the station was purchased by Pacific Star, it was announced that 2CH would be switching to only broadcasting on digital radio. 2CH was heard on DAB+ radio until 10 June 2022, after briefly simulcasting on DAB+ and 1170 kHz in the AM broadcast band. The station used be live-streamed over the internet until the station demise.

Although not the first 'DAB+ only' radio station in Australia, 2CH was probably the first to transition by relinquishing its AM radio frequency allocation.

Trevor Sinclair broadcast his final show on the AM broadcast band from Midday-7pm on 22 October 2020. Chris Kearns broadcast his show on both AM and DAB+ until midnight 22 October 2020, when the AM frequency 1170 kHz was taken over by 1170 SEN, carrying a dedicated sports broadcasting network, known as the Sports Entertainment Network. At 6 pm on 10 June 2022, 2CH left the airwaves for the final time with Jane Nield as the last live announcer. This follows an 18 month legacy after the Sports Entertainment Network purchased the station in 2020, and an unsuccessful DAB+ trial.

The former 2CH medium wave frequency, 1170 kHz, is now used by SEN 1170.

Veteran radio presenter Bob Rogers worked at the station, from 1995 until he retired in early October 2020, at the age of 93.
