= Norman Yardley =

English cricketer (1915–1989)

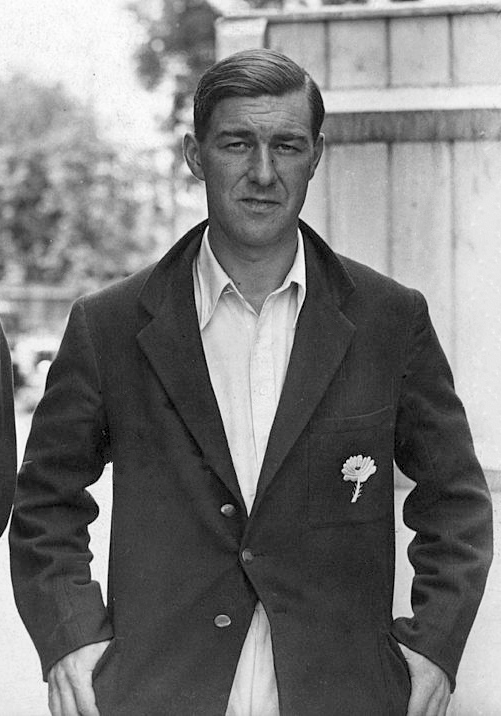
- Yardley in 1946

Personal information
- Born: 19 March 1915; Gawber, Barnsley, Yorkshire, England
- Died: 3 October 1989 (aged 74); Lodge Moor, Sheffield, Yorkshire, England
- Batting: Right-handed
- Bowling: Right arm medium
- Role: Middle-order batsman

International information
- National side: England
- Test debut (cap 307): 24 December 1938 v South Africa
- Last Test: 20 July 1950 v West Indies

Domestic team information
- Years: Team
- 1935–1938: Cambridge University
- 1936–1955: Yorkshire
- 1938–1952: MCC

Career statistics
| Competition | Test | First-class |
|---|---|---|
| Matches | 20 | 446 |
| Runs scored | 812 | 18,173 |
| Batting average | 25.37 | 31.17 |
| 100s/50s | 0/4 | 27/83 |
| Top score | 99 | 183* |
| Balls bowled | 1,662 | 21,080 |
| Wickets | 21 | 279 |
| Bowling average | 33.66 | 30.48 |
| 5 wickets in innings | 0 | 5 |
| 10 wickets in match | 0 | 0 |
| Best bowling | 3/67 | 6/29 |
| Catches/stumpings | 14/– | 328/1 |
- Source: CricketArchive, 17 August 2010

Norman Walter Dransfield Yardley (19 March 1915 – 3 October 1989) was an English cricketer who played for Cambridge University, Yorkshire County Cricket Club and England, as a right-handed batsman and occasional bowler. An amateur, he captained Yorkshire from 1948 to 1955 and England on fourteen occasions between 1947 and 1950, winning four Tests, losing seven and drawing three. Yardley was named Wisden Cricketer of the Year in 1948, and in his obituary in Wisden Cricketers' Almanack he was described as Yorkshire's finest amateur since Stanley Jackson.

Yardley played schoolboy cricket at St Peter's, York. A highly talented all-round sportsman, he went to St John's College, Cambridge, and won Blues at cricket, squash, Rugby fives and field hockey. In the university matches, he scored 90 in his second year, 101 in his third and was captain for his final year. He made his Yorkshire debut in 1936 and played for the county until 1955, when he retired as a player. He made his Test match debut against South Africa in 1939 and after the Second World War was chosen as vice-captain to Wally Hammond on the 1946—47 tour of Australia where he captained England in the fifth Test. He followed Hammond as skipper in 1947, and captained England intermittently until 1950 when his business commitments allowed. In 1948 he succeeded to the Yorkshire leadership when Brian Sellers resigned. Yardley remained in the position until 1955, during a time when Yorkshire had several difficult players in their dressing room. Under Yardley, Yorkshire were joint champions in 1949 but subsequently on a number of occasions, too often for the liking of supporters, finished second to Surrey in the County Championship. He served as a Test match selector between 1951 and 1954, acting as chairman of selectors in 1952. He was President of Yorkshire C.C.C. from 1981 to 1983, when he resigned after becoming involved in controversy over the decision to release Geoffrey Boycott in 1983. He died after a stroke in 1989.

== Early life ==
Yardley was born in Royston, near Barnsley, on 19 March 1915 to a family with no real background in cricket. He was sent to St Peter's, York, where he made a good impression as a cricketer, being in the school team for five years from 1930 and captain in his final two years. In 1933, his first season in charge, he scored 973 runs at an average of 88.45, scoring three centuries in consecutive innings. He headed the bowling averages, with 40 wickets at 11.90 runs per wicket. His form that season saw him selected for the match between Young Amateurs and Young Professionals at Lord's Cricket Ground, in which Yardley scored 189 in his first representative match, playing against his future England team-mate Denis Compton. In 1934, Yardley played in two further representative matches at Lord's, for The Rest against Lord's Schools, and for Public Schools against The Army, making 117, the first century in the fixture for Public Schools, and 63. Wisden Cricketers' Almanack later cited these successes as a demonstration of his ability to perform well on important occasions. While still at school, he came to the attention of Yorkshire County Cricket Club, playing for the Yorkshire Colts side and receiving coaching from George Hirst. He played for Yorkshire Second XI once in 1932, twice in 1933 and twice in 1934.

== First-class cricketer ==
=== University cricketer ===
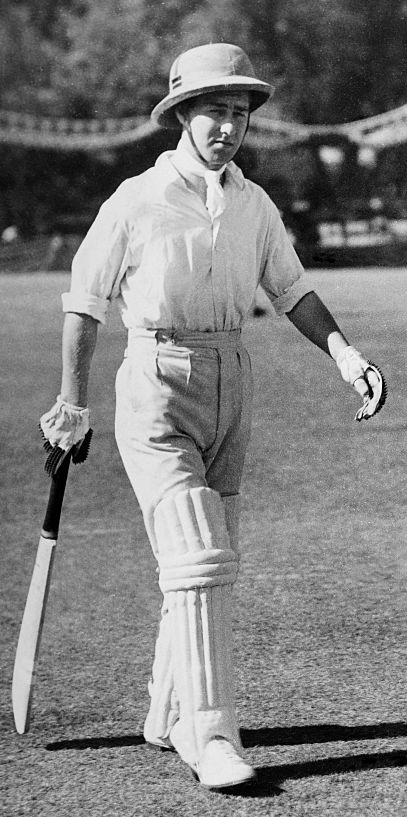
Yardley at an unofficial Test match against India in Lahore on 13 November 1937

Leaving St Peter's School, Yardley went to St John's College, Cambridge, where he immediately began to show all-round ability at sports. He won the North of England Squash Championships every year between 1934 and 1939, and won his Blue in hockey, squash, and Rugby fives. However, his main distinction came from cricket, where he was a Blue in each his four years at Cambridge. He played for the University team in his first year, the 1935 season, making ten first-class appearances without much success. His Wisden obituary noted that "class rather than performance guaranteed his place." He made his first-class debut against Sussex, scoring a duck in his first innings and 24 runs in the second. He passed fifty on just one occasion that season, scoring 319 runs at an average of 16.78, and bowled 69 balls without taking a wicket. Nevertheless, he played in the University Match, scoring just 19 and 36.

In the following season, Yardley improved considerably, becoming a dominant force in University Cricket according to Wisden. His maiden first-class century came in a narrow Cambridge victory over the Army, and he scored a second against Surrey, remaining not out for 116 in a total of 359. Bowling much more regularly, his maiden wickets in first-class cricket came in a performance of four wickets for 45 against Yorkshire, including the wicket of Len Hutton. Yardley topped the Cambridge batting averages and played an effective innings of 90 in the University Match. This display impressed Stanley Jackson, an influential former Yorkshire amateur cricketer, and he urged the Yorkshire selectors to include Yardley in the first team. Yardley was still appearing in the county second team at this stage, but at the end of August, he made his debut for the Yorkshire first eleven, appearing in the County Championship match against Derbyshire. He scored 12 in his only innings and took a wicket. He played in a further seven matches for Yorkshire, scoring 309 runs in ten innings with a highest score of 89 against Hampshire, with further fifties against Surrey and Marylebone Cricket Club (MCC). In all first-class cricket that season, Yardley scored 1,017 runs at an average of 37.66 and took 12 wickets at an average of 26.08.

Yardley continued to make progress in his batting in 1937. For Cambridge, he scored fifties against the Army and Surrey. Against Hampshire he took four for 47 and five for 41, and when Cambridge collapsed to 35 for six chasing a victory target of 141, he scored 64 not out to take the side to a win. Playing Sussex, he scored a century and took four for 36, while in the University match, he scored 101 in two and a half hours. Yardley's form saw him selected for the Gentlemen against the Players at Lord's, although he scored only 7 and 4, and when he joined Yorkshire after the Cambridge season, he made his first century for the county against Surrey, as well as three other fifties. His overall first-class figures were 1,472 runs at an average of 33.45 and 31 wickets at an average of 21.87. He was picked for the winter MCC tour of India, under the captaincy of Lord Tennyson, where he scored 519 runs at an average of 25.95 but only took one wicket. No official Tests were played on the tour, but Yardley played in the representative matches which took place, scoring 96 in the first game, but his highest score in four other innings was 31.

Honours continued to come Yardley's way in the 1938 season. He was chosen to captain Cambridge in his final season in the team; although his side did not win a match, Yardley enjoyed some personal success. Among his fifties were innings of 67 against the touring Australian team and 61 in the University Match. He was included in different representative sides; he was selected in a Test trial, playing for the Rest, and played a second game against the Australians for the Gentlemen of England, although he did not pass fifty in either match. For the Gentlemen against the Players, Yardley scored 88. He did not make the full England side but was twelfth man in two Tests against Australia. His highest innings of the season was 97 for Yorkshire against Gloucestershire, and in all first-class matches, Yardley accumulated 1,217 runs at an average of 31.20 and took 22 wickets at 35.45.

=== Test debut and war service ===
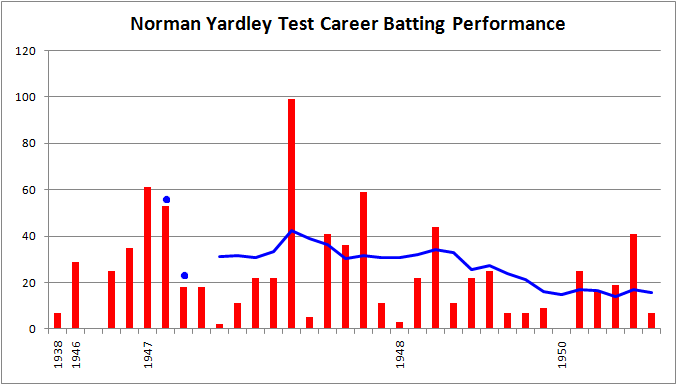
Yardley's Test career batting graph. The red bars indicate the runs that he scored in an innings, and the blue line indicates the batting average in his last 10 innings. The blue dots indicate innings in which he finished not out.

By this stage, Yorkshire regarded Yardley as the heir to Brian Sellers as captain, and the England Test selectors also began to prepare him to assume the England captaincy. At the end of the 1938 season, Yardley was chosen to tour South Africa with MCC as vice-captain to Wally Hammond. He made a good start to the tour, scoring centuries in his first two innings, both surpassing his previous highest score. Wisden noted that he made a good impression on spectators in these early matches. In his fourth match, he captained the MCC in Hammond's absence for the first time. When Len Hutton was injured in a tour match and missed the first Test, Yardey made his debut but scored just seven runs in a total of 422 and did not bat in the second innings. Hutton returned for the second match, and the successes of other batsmen meant that Yardley was not required in the other Tests on the tour. However, he scored a third century when he captained the MCC against Border.

Having built up a reputation as one of the best amateur cricketers in England, Yardley played three early-season matches for the MCC, but he was selected for neither the Gentlemen nor for England that year. He played his first full season for Yorkshire, scoring centuries against Cambridge, Warwickshire and Sussex; in total, he scored 1,086 runs at an average of 27.84 and took 17 wickets.

War brought first-class cricket to an end in 1939, and Yardley joined the 1st Battalion of the Green Howards, along with his Yorkshire team-mate Hedley Verity. After training in Omagh, Northern Ireland, where he played several cricket matches with Verity, he served in India, Iran, Syria, Egypt, Sicily, Italy and Iraq. In January 1944, he was wounded in Italy, rejoining the 1st Battalion in Iraq on his recovery to become an instructor, before being demobilised at the end of the war.

== Career after the war ==
=== Tour to Australia in 1946–47 ===
When County cricket resumed in England in 1946, Yorkshire won the County Championship. Yardley scored 788 runs at an average of 23.17, with just one century, for Yorkshire against Nottinghamshire. With the ball, he was used less frequently than before the war and took only nine wickets. He was not selected for any Test matches, but appeared for England in a Test trial and scored 39 and 11. He also played twice for the MCC and represented the Gentlemen against the Players, making 29 and a duck in a heavy defeat for the amateurs. Critics regarded his season as unsuccessful, but he was chosen as vice-captain to Hammond on the tour to Australia that winter, continuing his pre-war role.

It was intended that Yardley would appear lower down in the batting order, batting with a substantial total accumulated by the previous batsmen. However, the frailties of the England batting meant he often appeared in a crisis and had to rebuild several innings. Bill Bowes, the Yorkshire and England bowler who covered the tour as a journalist, was impressed by Yardley's approach, noting that he did not back away from the fast bowlers, who frequently bowled bouncers at him: "In fact, Yardley played cricket with a determination we had never seen in Yorkshire or in his days at the university." He made the greatest impression as a bowler, surprising commentators with his effectiveness. He did not bowl in the first six matches, but in his first over of the tour dismissed Arthur Morris who had already scored a century. From that point, he was used effectively to break up partnerships. In the Tests, he removed Donald Bradman in three successive innings, while in the third Test, he took two wickets, including Bradman, in two deliveries. Bowes believed the natural length of Yardley's bowling was perfect for Australian pitches—he was not skilful enough to alter the length at which he bowled so his bowling in other conditions was less effective. The Australian reporter Clif Cary wrote "It was always amusing to watch the Englishmen when Yardley took a wicket. The first time they seemed fairly amused, but when he was regularly breaking partnerships, their enthusiasm knew no bounds, and it is said that in Melbourne after he had obtained Bradman's wicket for the third time, Yardley blushed profusely when one excited team-mate slapped him on the back and shouted "Well, bowled, Spofforth".

In the Tests, Yardley's only scores over fifty, his first in Test cricket, came in the third Test, where he scored 61 and 53 not out. In England's first innings, he helped his side to recover from a batting collapse, surviving for two hours. His second innings lasted 89 minutes and helped England to avoid defeat for the first time in the series. In the same match, Yardley bowled more overs than he had done previously on the whole tour, following injuries to Bill Voce and Bill Edrich, two of England's main bowlers. Bowling leg theory with a fielder concentrated on the leg side, Yardley managed to move the ball off the seam. He dismissed Bradman twice in the match, having figures of three for 67 in the second innings and taking five wickets in the match. This was the first time that an England player had scored fifty runs in both innings and taken five wickets in a Test. Yardley also had a substantial bowling workload in the fourth Test, delivering 31 overs in Australia's first innings to take three for 101. When Hammond did not play in the final Test, Yardley became captain, doing so courageously according to Wisden, which also pointed out that Yardley used field placement more effectively than Hammond. In the series, Yardley scored 252 runs at an average of 32.50, His ten wickets at an average of 37.20 placed him first in the series bowling averages. He played in the drawn Test on the short tour to New Zealand which followed, opening the batting scoring 22 and taking a wicket.

=== England captain ===
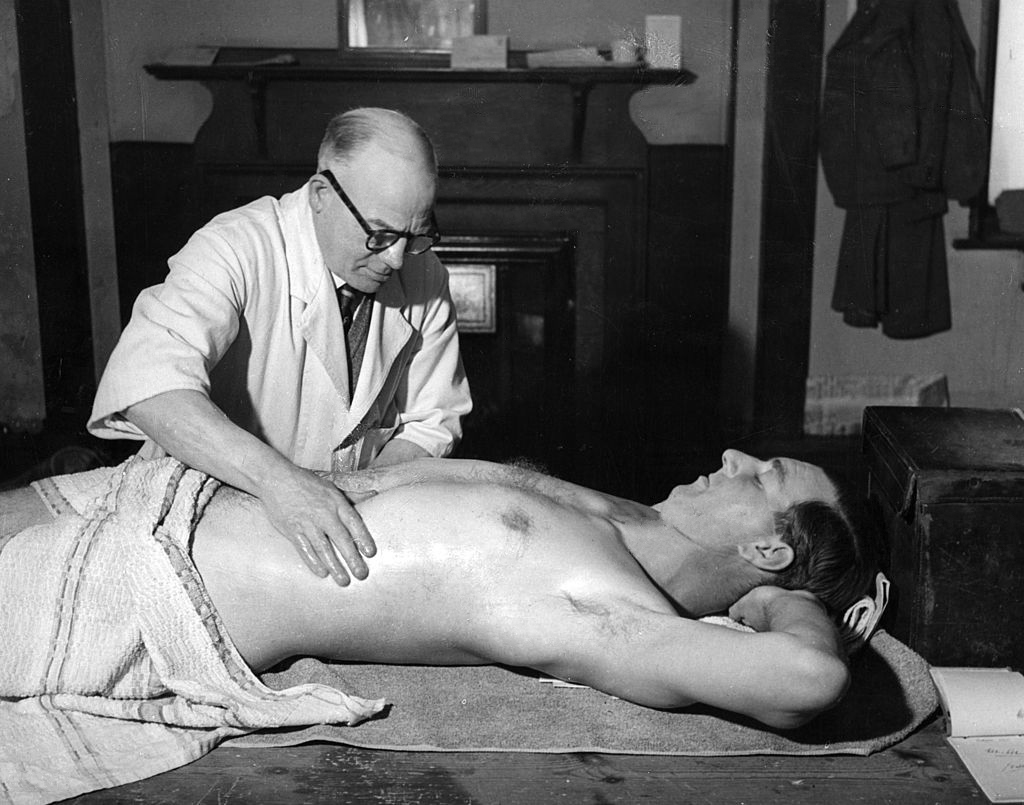
Yardley receiving massage in 1947 before a match against South Africa

Yardley enjoyed his most successful season with the bat in the 1947 season, scoring 1,906 runs at an average of 44.32 with five centuries; his bowling took eleven wickets. Following Hammond's retirement immediately after the 1946–47 tour, Yardley captained England against South Africa throughout the season. In the first Test, he made his highest Test score. England were unexpectedly made to follow on in the face of a large South African total; when Yardley came to the crease in the second innings, England looked likely to be defeated at 170 for four, still 155 runs behind the tourists. Yardley scored 99, being caught in the slips just before reaching his century, but his batting had helped to save the game and earned praise from Wisden for "batting soundly".He eventually became the first test captain to be dismissed for 99 in a test innings Yardley and Denis Compton added 237, which was a record partnership for the fifth wicket in England and remains, in August 2010, England's best fifth wicket stand against South Africa. Yardley's only other score over fifty in the series came in the drawn fifth Test when he scored 59. However, he scored 41 in just over an hour in helpful conditions for fast bowlers in the third Test and 36 on a difficult pitch in the fourth Test. Yardley scored 273 runs at an average of 39.00 in the series. In contrast to his efforts in Australia, he bowled just six overs in the series without taking a wicket. England won the second, third and fourth Tests to win the series, helped by a negative approach from the tourists. Yardley captained the Gentlemen against the Players for the first time, at Lord's and Scarborough, and captained The Rest against Middlesex, the County Champions. His batting and captaincy in the season earned him selection as one of Wisden's Cricketers of the Year.

=== Playing the Invincibles ===
Following Brian Sellers' resignation, Yardley was appointed Yorkshire captain at the start of the 1948 season. With his England commitments and other absences, he only played in 12 County Championship matches. He had not toured the West Indies with MCC in 1947–48, when Gubby Allen captained the side. However, Yardley resumed his leadership of England when Australia, captained by Bradman, toured the country without losing a match. Yardley led the MCC in an early match against the tourists, and captained England in a Test trial, but only played three other games, all for Yorkshire, before the first Test, with a top score of 46.

In the first Test, England were bowled out for 165 after Yardley won the toss and batted in difficult conditions. Wisden did not blame Yardley for the collapse as England did not bat well. He then set defensive fields to keep down Australia's scoring rate, taking a wicket himself with his fourth ball as part of figures of two for 32. The Australian batsmen found it difficult to score quickly against the negative tactics but still established a lead of 344. Yardley batted for an hour in the second innings to score 22 but Australia recorded an eight-wicket win. Before the second Test, Yardley played for Yorkshire against the Australians, and although unsuccessful with the bat, took two for nine with the ball, his first wickets of the season for his county.

England adopted an aggressive strategy in the second Test, but could not avoid a second defeat. Yardley frequently changed his bowlers to unsettle the Australians in their first innings, and took two for 35 himself as England briefly held the advantage. However, the lower order batsmen mounted a recovery, Yardley being criticised for his reluctance to bowl Doug Wright. The England captain then arrested a batting collapse by adding 87 with Denis Compton, scoring 44 himself, but Australia led by 135 on first innings. Yardley took two wickets in two balls in Australia's second innings, narrowly missing a hat-trick when Keith Miller only just got his bat down on the ball to avoid being bowled, and had figures of two for 36, but Australia scored 460 for seven and bowled England out for 186. In between Tests, Yardley scored his only century of the season, but his contributions to the third Test were minimal. He scored 22 and bowled four wicketless overs. However, the home side fought back in the match, for which Len Hutton was dropped. England scored 363 and bowled out Australia for 221. They scored 174 for three before declaring, but rain intervened to prevent Yardley from pushing for a win.

England maintained their newly confident approach, being on top for most of the fourth Test. Yardley's men scored 496 and achieved a first innings lead of 38, Yardley contributing two wickets. England increased their lead by 365 before Yardley declared. He kept the team batting for five minutes on the last day, allowing him to use the heavy roller to quicken the break-up of the pitch. Australia had to score 404 in 345 minutes, a target considered unlikely as such a large total had never been made to win a Test match. In addition, the pitch was difficult to bat on by now and the spinners could turn the ball sharply. However, England made several errors: Godfrey Evans, the England wicket-keeper had a bad day and missed some stumping chances; three catches were dropped by fielders, and England's only specialist spinner, Jim Laker, bowled poorly. Consequently, Yardley was forced to use Denis Compton's bowling. Compton was not a specialist bowler and although he caused problems for the batsmen, Bill Bowes believed the selectors were mistaken in expecting him to be as effective as a front-line spinner. Yardley seemed unsure of the best course of action as Bradman and Arthur Morris added 301 runs for the second wicket; he resorted to using the very occasional leg spin of Hutton, who was hit for 30 runs in four overs, although Yardley himself dropped a catch from Hutton's bowling. The pitch conditions were unfavourable for the faster bowlers, but the ineffectiveness of the spinners forced Yardley to take the new ball. Australia won by seven wickets; the spectators were unhappy with the inadequate English bowling and the absence of a suitable bowler to exploit the pitch on the last day. Bowes later criticised Yardley for allowing Australia to score quickly enough to win; he believed that Yardley used Hutton's bowling to encourage the tourists to take risks against lesser bowling to keep up with the required rate of scoring, but he miscalculated in using such bowling for too long. Wisden also stated that England should have won the match.

Around this time, and particularly after the fourth Test defeat, critics suggested that Walter Robins, one of the selectors, should captain England to bring a more attacking approach to the job. However, Robins' age counted against him; the selectors were satisfied with Yardley's captaincy in what were difficult circumstances, and retained him for the final Test. In that match, he failed twice with the bat, scoring 7 and 9 as England were humiliated, bowled out for 52 and 188 to lose by an innings. England lost the series 4–0. Yardley managed 150 runs at an average of 16.66, not passing fifty in a single innings. However, he once again topped the England bowling averages, taking nine wickets at an average of 22.66. Bowes believed that the pressure of captaincy had affected Yardley's batting. Bowes also cast doubt on Yardley's future, stating that other commitments may have prevented his continuing to play cricket much longer.

Yardley's only other representative appearance in 1948 was as captain of the Gentlemen against the Players at Lords, where he scored 61. In the whole season, he scored 1,061 runs at an average of 29.47 and 14 wickets at an average of 35.14—he took just five wickets outside of the Tests.

=== Captain of Yorkshire ===
Yardley was unavailable to captain the MCC tour of South Africa in the winter of 1948–49, which was led by George Mann. Mann did well enough to retain the position for two Tests in the 1949 season; Freddie Brown captained the other two and Yardley did not play for England that year. In all first-class matches that season, he scored 1,612 runs at an average of 37.48 and took 22 wickets at an average of 33.86. He did not score a century in the County Championship, but passed three figures for Yorkshire against the New Zealand touring team and for the North against the South in a festival match. His only representative game outside of festival matches was for the Gentlemen against the Players at Lord's; Mann was appointed captain for the game. That season, Yorkshire shared the County Championship with Middlesex, the only time Yorkshire won the competition during Yardley's leadership.

Yardley's batting form dipped in the 1950 season. He scored 1,082 runs at an average of 24.59, the final time he reached four figures in a season. With the ball he took 19 wickets at an average of 32.10. Yorkshire finished third in the County Championship behind joint winners Lancashire and Surrey. It took seven matches for Yardley to reach fifty runs in an innings, but he hit centuries against Surrey, Somerset and Scotland in the second half of the season. The West Indies toured England and Yardley resumed the England captaincy; he also captained MCC against the tourists and England against The Rest in a Test trial. However, neither Yardley nor Mann, the two likeliest candidates, were able to accept the captaincy of the MCC side in Australia that winter. The selectors spent much of the season assessing other players. Although Yardley represented the Gentlemen against the Players, the side was led by Brown, who scored a century and was appointed captain of the touring side. Brown also assumed the captaincy of England for the final Test against West Indies and Yardley was left out of the team. In the three Tests he played, Yardley scored 108 runs at an average of 18.00 with a top score of 41. He won the first Test but lost the next two, West Indies' first Test wins in England; the final Test was also lost by Brown. Following this series, Yardley did not play any more Tests, although his name was mentioned as a potential captain in 1953 before Hutton was appointed as England's first professional captain of the twentieth century. At the time, Yardley was still considered the best amateur candidate. In 20 Tests, Yardley scored 812 runs at an average of 25.37 and four fifties. With the ball, he took 21 wickets at an average of 33.66. On the fourteen occasions he was captain, he won four times, lost seven and drew three.

Yorkshire finished second in the County Championship to Warwickshire in the 1951 season and second to Surrey in the 1952 season. However, in following season, Yorkshire dropped to equal twelfth, their worst ever finish at that time. In the following two seasons, the team was again runners-up, Surrey winning on both occasions. Yardley scored more than 850 runs in each season, but only managed two more centuries. These were 183 not out against Hampshire in 1951, the highest innings of his career, and an unbeaten score of exactly 100 against Gloucestershire in his final season. His batting average was generally between 24 and 31, except in 1953 when in matches in England he averaged 36.53. Yardley used himself as a bowler more often in 1951 and 1952, delivering more overs than at any other time in his career in the latter year. He took 32 and 43 wickets respectively in each season, his highest two-season totals, and took five wickets in an innings on three occasions, having only done so twice before. However, he bowled less often during his final three seasons, with a subsequent drop in his tally of wickets. His only representative cricket, apart from annual matches at the Scarborough Festival for the Gentlemen against the Players and occasionally for T. N. Pearce's XI, was the Gentlemen v Players match at Lord's in 1954.

Judgements were mixed on Yardley's performance as Yorkshire's captain. His record would have been considered good at any other county, but not by the standards set by previous Yorkshire sides. Critics felt that Yorkshire should have won the Championship with the players available. Contemporaries believed him to be the best captain in the country tactically, taking reasonable chances without too many risks and judging players' strengths and weaknesses. Trevor Bailey, who played against him for Essex and under him for England, wrote that he thought him "an outstanding tactician and an expert on wicket behaviour. He was unquestionably one of the best captains I have ever played with or against. It has been said that he was too nice to lead Yorkshire, but I cannot think of anybody I have preferred playing under." Alan Gibson believed that unlike some county captains, Yardley was worth his place in the side on cricketing ability. However, he seemed unable to extract the best from his players. Jim Kilburn noted that he used orthodox tactics, even when a different approach was called for, while other critics believed that he was shocked by the attitude of some difficult players in the side. Neither Yardley nor Hutton, his senior professional, was a disciplinarian in the dressing room and kept apart from others. Both were frequently absent, playing in representative matches. This may have inflamed the situation, leading to accusations that some players were out of control. Yardley disliked confrontation, and Ray Illingworth, who played under him, described him as too nice to stand up to his players. But Bob Appleyard, another of his former players, gives Yardley credit for recognising his potential and encouraging him to become a spinner, and believes that he and Hutton made a formidable pair of tacticians. Generally, he was popular with his players.

Between 1951 and 1954, Yardley served as a Test selector, serving as chairman in 1952 at the time when Hutton was chosen as England captain. Following the 1955 season, aged 40 and increasingly bothered by lumbago, Yardley retired from the team. He ended his first-class career with 18,173 runs at an average of 31.17, and 279 wickets at an average of 30.48. Wisden later described him as "the finest Yorkshire amateur since F. S. Jackson".

== Style and technique ==
Yardley had a good technique for batting. He possessed a fluent, attractive style, and his height allowed him to reach the ball and drive more comfortably than most. His best shots were on the leg side, using his strong wrists to turn the ball away when it was aimed towards his legs. Yardley performed best when his side was in difficulty, and he could play attacking or defensive innings depending on the situation. He bowled intelligently, leading to greater rewards than his gentle style led opponents to expect, but remained a reluctant bowler who was surprised by his own success. He was a good fielder in positions close to the batsmen.

== Career after cricket ==
Yardley worked as a wine merchant outside cricket. After he retired from playing he worked as a cricket journalist and served as an expert summariser on Test Match Special from 1956 until 1969, as well as in 1973. According to David Frith, the only time he was moved to express severe disapproval was when Brian Close was dismissed after a poor shot in the Fourth Test in 1961 at Old Trafford; this was part of a final-day England collapse that handed Australia the match and a 2–1 series win after the hosts had been on course for victory and the series lead. Trevor Bailey, who was a colleague in the commentary box for the later part of Yardley's time with Test Match Special, wrote: "I always considered Norman Yardley to be an ideal summariser: accurate, informative and very sensible, and able to explain not only what happened but also the reasons why. His knowledge about pitches, tactics and the technicalities of the game was exceptional... Articulate, expert, and possessing considerable charge [sic], I thought his interpretation of events on the field and his post-session summaries were sound, balanced and never less than fair."

He served on the Yorkshire Cricket Committee, and from 1981, he was Yorkshire President. However, he became involved in the controversy surrounding Geoffrey Boycott, to whom the committee had decided not to give a new contract. Yardley resigned early in 1984 after a vote of no confidence, dismayed by the attitude of Boycott's supporters. Anthony Woodhouse wrote in his history of Yorkshire: "he conducted affairs in a fair and unbiased manner. Alas, he should never have been burdened with the politics of Yorkshire cricket in the 1980s." He died at Lodge Moor, Sheffield on 3 October 1989 following a stroke.

== Bibliography ==
- Bailey, Trevor (1986). Wickets, Catches and the Odd Run. Collins Willow. ISBN 0-00-218127-4.
- Bowes, Bill (1949). Express Deliveries. London: Stanley Paul.
- Chalke, Stephen; Hodgson, Derek (2003). No Coward Soul. The remarkable story of Bob Appleyard. Bath: Fairfield Books. ISBN 0-9531196-9-6.
- Gibson, Alan (1979). The Cricket Captains of England. London: Cassell. ISBN 0-304-29779-8.
- Hodgson, Derek (1989). The Official History of Yorkshire County Cricket Club. Ramsbury, Marlborough, Wiltshire: The Crowood Press. ISBN 1-85223-274-9.
- Swanton, E. W. (1999). Cricketers of My Time. London: Andre Deutsch. ISBN 0-233-99746-6.
- Woodhouse, Anthony (1989). The History of Yorkshire County Cricket Club. London: Christopher Helm. ISBN 0-7470-3408-7.

Sporting positions
| Preceded by W.R.Hammond | English national cricket captain 1947 | Succeeded by Gubby Allen |
| Preceded by Gubby Allen | English national cricket captain 1948 | Succeeded by F.G.Mann |
| Preceded by F.G.Mann | English national cricket captain 1950 | Succeeded by F.R.Brown |
