= David Dyer (cricketer) =

South African cricketer (born 1946)

Personal information
- Born: 3 December 1946 (age 79)
- Source: Cricinfo, 18 July 2020

David Dyer (born 3 December 1946) is a South African cricketer. He played in 109 first-class matches between 1965 and 1982. His father, Dennis Dyer, was also an international cricketer. Dyer was captain of Transvaal during the 1970s.

== See also ==
- International cricket in South Africa from 1971 to 1981
