= Tony Harris (sportsman) =

South African cricketer and rugby union footballer

- Tony Harris scoring the second try during the South Africa v. British Lions match at Ellis Park.
- Full name: Terence Anthony Harris
- Born: 27 August 1916 Kimberley, South Africa
- Died: 7 March 1993 (aged 76) Plettenberg Bay, Cape Province, South Africa
- School: St. Patrick's Christian Brothers' College

Rugby union career
- Position: fly-half
International career
Years	Team	Apps	(Points)
1937–1938	South Africa	5	(3)
- Cricket career

Cricket information
- Batting: Right-handed

International information
- National side: South Africa
- Test debut: 7 June 1947 v England
- Last Test: 12 February 1949 v England

Career statistics
Competition	Test	First-class
Matches	3	55
Runs scored	100	3,028
Batting average	25.00	41.47
100s/50s	0/1	6/16
Top score	60	191*
Catches/stumpings	1/–	52/–
- Source: Cricinfo, 15 November 2022

Terence Anthony Harris (27 August 1916 – 7 March 1993) known as Tony Harris, was a South African sportsman who was the last man to be a dual international of both cricket and rugby union for his country. He represented South Africa in five rugby union Tests during the 1930s as a fly-half, following World War II he played Test cricket three times between 1947 and 1949 as an attacking batsman.

A short man at five feet six inches, Harris was noted for his agility around a rugby pitch which transferred into cricket making him an exceptional fielder. An all-round sportsman, he excelled at several other sports including tennis and squash.

== Rugby career ==
Educated at St. Patrick's Christian Brothers' College, Kimberley, Harris played club rugby for Pirates in Johannesburg. Despite the club not putting him forward for international trials, he was selected by South Africa for the tour of Australia and New Zealand in 1937. After losing the first Test to New Zealand, Harris was brought into the team for the second match allowing Danie Craven to switch to his best position of scrum half. South Africa proceeded to turn the series around winning 2–1, the only time South Africa ever won a Test series in New Zealand. The following year, he played all three Tests on the British Lions tour of South Africa. Harris was a less conservative fly-half than most of his contemporaries preferring use of grubber kicks to kicking for touch and formed a successful half-back partnership with Craven.

== Cricket career ==
Harris made his first-class cricket debut in December 1933 in the Currie Cup for Griqualand West, aged 17, scoring 114 not out in the second innings of the match against Orange Free State. He later moved to Johannesburg and represented the Transvaal team from the 1936–37 season.

Harris scored two centuries during the 1945–46 season and was selected on South Africa's tour of England in 1947. He made his Test debut at Trent Bridge, scoring 60 with "strong square-cuts and cover-drives" according to Wisden. After scores of 30 and 3 in the second Test at Lord's, on both occasions dismissed by Denis Compton, Harris was replaced in the Test team by Dennis Dyer. Across the whole tour, Harris played 15 first-class matches, scoring 701 runs at an average of 36.89 with his sole century of the trip coming against Glamorgan.

Back in South Africa, Harris topped the batting averages in the 1947–48 Currie Cup with 541 runs at 135.25 including a career best 191 not out. The following season, he scored 98 against the touring Marylebone Cricket Club (England) side and was recalled for the fourth Test in Johannesburg, he scored 6 and 1 not out in what was his final first-class match.

== Second World War ==
During the Second World War, Harris served with the South African Air Force as a pilot. In early 1945, his Spitfire plane was shot down over the Adriatic Sea. After bailing out he was captured and held as a prisoner of war in Italy.

== Later life ==
After his cricket career, Harris worked for Adidas in South Africa as an agent and manager.

Hearris died on 7 March 1993, aged 76. He was survived by his wife, Betty, and three children.
