= Winston Place =

English cricketer

Personal information
- Full name: Winston Place
- Born: 7 December 1914; Rawtenstall, Lancashire, England
- Died: 25 January 2002 (aged 87); Burnley, Lancashire, England
- Batting: Right-handed
- Bowling: Right-arm slow
- Role: Opening Batsman

International information
- National side: England
- Test debut (cap 329): 21 January 1948 v West Indies
- Last Test: 1 April 1948 v West Indies

Domestic team information
- Years: Team
- 1937–1955: Lancashire
- 1947/48: Marylebone Cricket Club (MCC)

Career statistics
Competition	Test	FC
Matches	3	324
Runs scored	144	15,609
Batting average	28.80	35.62
100s/50s	1/0	36/71
Top score	107	266*
Balls bowled	0	60
Wickets	0	1
Bowling average	–	42.00
5 wickets in innings	–	0
10 wickets in match	–	0
Best bowling	–	1/2
Catches/stumpings	0/–	191/–
- Source: CricketArchive, 17 December 2008

Winston Place (7 December 1914 − 25 January 2002) was an English cricketer who played in three Tests in 1948. An opening batsman for Lancashire, he shared a prolific partnership with Cyril Washbrook and was part of the county championship winning side of 1950. Place played first-class cricket until 1955, when his contract was not renewed. He became an umpire for one season, but retired to spend more time with his family.

== Youth and early career ==
Winston Place was born in Rawtenstall; he was orphaned at the age of 5 and was raised by his aunt. He represented Rawtenstall's cricket team in the Lancashire League. At the age of 15, Place began opening the batting for his club side. The club's professional player, Sydney Barnes, recommended Place to Lancashire County Cricket Club. Place served an apprenticeship as an engineer before serving an apprenticeship at Lancashire in 1936.

The Lancashire batting line up of the time was a strong one, and Place had limited opportunities to break into the first team. He managed to make his debut in 1937, scoring his maiden century in his first season against Nottinghamshire. He finished with 563 runs from 14 matches at an average of 29.63. He enjoyed playing for Lancashire; on the last day of his first season, when asked by other cricketers in the Lancashire team how he would be spending his holiday, he replied "this is the last day of my holiday". Between 1937 and 1939, Place was unable to secure a permanent place in Lancashire's team and in three seasons he managed 1,277 runs in 33 matches at an average of 29.02 with two centuries. In 1939, when opening with Cyril Washbrook as a replacement for the injured Eddie Paynter, Place scored 164 against the touring West Indies team. In 1939, Place was awarded his cap by Lancashire.

The outbreak of the Second World War prevented Place from playing first-class cricket until 1946, he was able to play charity matches and represented Horwich in the Bolton Cricket League. During the war, worked as an engineer in Accrington. He was married in 1940.

== Post-war career ==
After the war, Place, who was 31 at the time, was the first choice batsman to open with Cyril Washbrook. The partnership was one of the most prolific for Lancashire and the best on the county circuit at the time. The 1946 and 1947 English cricket seasons were Place's most successful, producing 1,868 runs at 41.51 and 2,501 at 62.52 respectively. These were his most productive seasons and in 1947 he scored 10 centuries including his career best 266 not out which was scored against Oxford University; his second-highest total centuries for a season is four. He was 12th man for England against South Africa when they played a Test match at Headingley. Place's "golden summer" earned him selection for England's tour of the West Indies when Denis Compton, Bill Edrich, Len Hutton, and fellow Lancastrian Cyril Washbrook opted out of the tour.

He made his debut on 21 January 1948 against the West Indies at Bridgetown. Place opened the batting with Jack Robertson, but was unsuccessful, scoring 12 in the first innings and 1 not out in the second when he dropped down the batting order to number six. Place sustained a bruised knuckle in the Test and missed the second Test due to a ruptured groin muscle that happened during a tour match against Trinidad. He was able to return for the final two matches of the series. Due to injuries to the team, Len Hutton had been called up, forcing Place to move from his accustomed place opening the batting to number three. In the third Test, he scored 1 and 15. Place's most significant Test innings came in his final match. After scoring 8 in the first innings, Place scored a battling 107, his only Test century.

On his return to England, Place drifted out of England contention, and did not even feature in the Test trial as England prepared for Australia's tour in 1948. Despite being overlooked by the national selectors, he remained an integral part of Lancashire's batting line up, scoring 1,000 every season between 1946 and 1953. In 1949, Place suffered a broken hand, keeping him from playing seven matches, although he did manage a county championship best of 226 not out against Nottinghamshire. He toured with the Commonwealth XI which toured India, Pakistan, and Sri Lanka in 1949/50, scoring 386 runs at 20.31 in 12 matches.

== Decline and after cricket ==
Place's benefit year was in 1952 and raised £6,297; at the time this figure was only bettered by the benefits of Washbrook and Dick Pollard, and demonstrated his popularity with the Lancashire fans. The last time Place passed 1,000 runs in a season was in 1953. In 1954 he averaged a disappointing 21.64 with only one century, but the 1955 season was leaner still, amassing only 179 runs from 10 matches. At the age of 40, Place was released by Lancashire, and on being told his career with Lancashire was over he broke down in tears.

He became a first-class umpire, and although he enjoyed the job he disliked being separated from his family and quit after one season. Of Place's umpiring, Peter Tinniswood said "I am reminded here of that great and saintly Lancashire cricketer, Mr Winston Place, who on retiring from the first-class game took up umpiring. He resigned from his position, however, because such was his goodness and benevolence, he could not bear to give people out. God is rather like Winston Place". On retiring, he became a newsagent in his home town of Rawtenstall, even playing for the town's cricket team, living with his wife and two daughters. He died on 25 January 2002.
