= Arthur Brodhurst =

English cricketer and schoolteacher (1916–2006)

Personal information
- Full name: Arthur Hugh Brodhurst
- Born: 21 July 1916; Buenos Aires, Argentina
- Died: 24 June 2006 (aged 89); Winchester, England
- Nickname: Podge
- Batting: Right-handed
- Bowling: Right arm off break
- Relatives: Harry Altham (father-in-law)

Domestic team information
- Years: Team
- 1937–39: Cambridge University
- 1939–46: Gloucestershire
- 1951: Marylebone Cricket Club (MCC)

Career statistics
| Competition | FC |
|---|---|
| Matches | 20 |
| Runs scored | 658 |
| Batting average | 21.22 |
| 100s/50s | 2/1 |
| Top score | 111 |
| Balls bowled | 614 |
| Wickets | 6 |
| Bowling average | 53.50 |
| 5 wickets in innings |
| 10 wickets in match |
| Best bowling | 4 for 83 |
| Catches/stumpings | 8 |
- Source: CricketArchive

Arthur Hugh ("Podge") Brodhurst (1916 – 2006) was an English cricketer and schoolteacher.

Brodhurst was educated at Malvern College and Pembroke College, Cambridge. He played first-class cricket for Cambridge University and Gloucestershire from 1937 to 1946, re-appearing in a single first-class game for MCC in Canada in 1951. During the Second World War he was in the Royal Artillery commanding anti-aircraft units in the North African desert; later he was liaison officer with the Czech Armoured Brigade and ended the war as town major of Haarlem, where he re-introduced cricket to Holland. He taught at Winchester College from 1946 to 1978, including three periods in charge of cricket, and was a housemaster from 1954 to 1970. His nickname there was Ahab in recognition of his initials and his obsessive behaviour.

Brodhurst married Meg, daughter of the cricket historian Harry Altham who was also a housemaster at Winchester College. They had three children.
