= Leslie Payn =

South African cricketer (1915–1992)

Leslie William Payn (6 May 1915 – 2 May 1992) was a South African cricketer active from 1936 to 1953 who played for Natal and was a member of the South African team that toured the British Isles in 1947 but did not play in the Test team.

Payn was educated at Michaelhouse. He did not represent South Africa in Test cricket. Payn was an orthodox slow left arm spinner who was born in Umzinto, Natal, on 6 May 1915. He died on 2 May 1992 at Scottburgh, Natal. Although a left arm bowler, he batted righthanded. He made 51 first-class appearances and took 151 wickets with a best performance of eight for 89. Although he was a tailender, he scored one first-class century when he made his highest score of 103.

== Sources ==
- Leslie Payn at ESPNcricinfo
- Playfair Cricket Annual – 1948 edition
