= 1952 English cricket season =

1952 was the 53rd season of County Championship cricket in England. It was the beginning of Surrey's period of dominance as they won the first of seven successive County Championships. England defeated India 3–0 in the Test series.

== Honours ==
- County Championship – Surrey
- Minor Counties Championship – Buckinghamshire
- Wisden (Wisden Cricketers of the Year in the 1953 edition for their record in the 1952 season) – Harold Gimblett, Tom Graveney, David Sheppard, Stuart Surridge, Fred Trueman

== Test series ==
England defeated India 3–0 with one match rained off in a four-match series. India had no answer to the pace of Fred Trueman and the guile of Alec Bedser, who between them took 49 Test wickets.

== Leading batsmen ==
1952 English cricket season – leading batsmen by average
Name	Innings	Runs	Highest	Average	100s
David Sheppard	39	2262	239*	64.62	10
Peter May	47	2498	197	62.45	10
Leonard Hutton	45	2567	189	61.11	11
Ted Lester	42	1786	178	49.61	6
Willie Watson	43	1651	114	48.55	3

1952 English cricket season – leading batsmen by aggregate
Name	Innings	Runs	Highest	Average	100s
Leonard Hutton	45	2567	189	61.11	11
Peter May	47	2498	197	62.45	10
Don Kenyon	60	2489	171	42.91	7
Jack Robertson	64	2337	162	37.69	2
Bill Edrich	63	2281	239	38.66	6

== Leading bowlers ==
1952 English cricket season – leading bowlers by average
Name	Balls	Maidens	Runs	Wickets	Average
Fred Trueman	1694	57	841	61	13.78
Alec Bedser	7114	296	2530	154	16.42
Tony Lock	6658	416	2237	131	17.07
Charles Grove	5673	240	2022	118	17.13
Len Muncer	5174	259	1816	105	17.29

1952 English cricket season – leading bowlers by aggregate
Name	Balls	Maidens	Runs	Wickets	Average
Johnny Wardle	11144	810	3460	177	19.54
Jack Young	8641	514	3241	163	19.88
Alec Bedser	7114	296	2530	154	16.42
Cliff Gladwin	7550	402	2917	152	19.19
Roy Tattersall	6995	409	2586	146	17.71

== Annual reviews ==
- Playfair Cricket Annual 1953
- Wisden Cricketers' Almanack 1953
