= Rowland Shaddick =

English cricketer

Personal information
- Full name: Rowland Allen Shaddick
- Born: 26 March 1920; Clapton, London, England
- Died: 12 January 1994 (aged 73); Enfield, London
- Batting: Right-handed
- Bowling: Right-arm off-spin

Domestic team information
- Years: Team
- 1946–1947: Middlesex

Career statistics
Competition	First-class
Matches	20
Runs scored	62
Batting average	5.16
100s/50s	0/0
Top score	12 not out
Balls bowled	2573
Wickets	49
Bowling average	28.93
5 wickets in innings	1
10 wickets in match	0
Best bowling	5/34
Catches/stumpings	6/0
- Source: Cricinfo, 22 August 2014

Rowland Allen Shaddick (26 March 1920 – 12 January 1994) was an English cricketer active from 1946 to 1955 who played for Middlesex, Marylebone Cricket Club (MCC) and Free Foresters. He was born in Clapton, London, and died in Enfield, Middlesex.

An amateur cricketer who worked as a doctor, Shaddick appeared in twenty first-class matches as a right-handed batsman who bowled off breaks. He scored 62 runs with a highest score of 12 not out and took 49 wickets with a best performance of 5 for 34 for Free Foresters against Oxford University in 1952. His most successful season was 1947 when he played nine matches and took 29 wickets at an average of 22.20, including 4 for 46 and 4 for 54 for Middlesex against Cambridge University.
