= Alfred Coleman (cricketer) =

English cricketer (1906–1978)

Personal information
- Full name: Charles Alfred Richard Coleman
- Born: 7 July 1906; Gumley, Leicestershire, England
- Died: 14 June 1978 (aged 71); Market Harborough, Leicestershire, England
- Bowling: Right-arm fast-medium

Domestic team information
- Years: Team
- 1926–1935: Leicestershire

Umpiring information
- Tests umpired: 2 (1947)
- FC umpired: 142 (1946–1957)

Career statistics
Competition	First-class
Matches	114
Runs scored	2,403
Batting average	15.01
100s/50s	1/7
Top score	114
Balls bowled	6,865
Wickets	100
Bowling average	35.76
5 wickets in innings	1
10 wickets in match	0
Best bowling	5/30
Catches/stumpings	60/–
- Source: Cricinfo, 2 July 2022

Charles Alfred Richard Coleman (7 July 1906 – 14 June 1978) was an English first-class cricketer and test match umpire.

== Life and career ==
Coleman was born in Gumley, Leicestershire. He played 114 first-class matches for Leicestershire between 1926 and 1935 as a right-arm fast-medium bowler and middle-order batsman. He took 100 wickets and scored 2403 runs with a best of 114. He stood in two England v South Africa tests in 1947.

Coleman died in Market Harborough in 1978.
