= 1951 English cricket season =

1951 was the 52nd season of County Championship cricket in England. It produced a surprise title for Warwickshire, their first for forty years and only the second in their history.

It was the first achieved under a professional captain, Tom Dollery, one of the Wisden Cricketers of the Year in 1952. It was a comfortable victory as Warwickshire won 16 matches while second-placed Yorkshire won 12 and lost twice convincingly to Warwickshire.

South Africa toured England to compete in a test series in which England won 3–1.

== Honours ==
- County Championship - Warwickshire
- Minor Counties Championship - Kent II
- Wisden - Bob Appleyard, Tom Dollery, Jim Laker, Peter May, Eric Rowan

== Test series ==
England defeated South Africa 3–1 with one match drawn.

== Leading batsmen ==
1951 English cricket season – leading batsmen by average
Name	Innings	Runs	Highest	Average	100s
Peter May	43	2339	178*	68.79	9
Denis Compton	40	2193	172	64.50	8
John Dewes	10	515	116*	64.37	2
Freddie Jakeman	41	1989	258*	56.82	6
Jack Robertson	56	2917	201*	56.09	7

1951 English cricket season – leading batsmen by aggregate
Name	Innings	Runs	Highest	Average	100s
Jack Robertson	56	2917	201*	56.09	7
Peter May	43	2339	178*	68.79	9
Tom Graveney	50	2291	201	48.74	8
Denis Compton	40	2193	172	64.50	8
Len Hutton	47	2145	194*	55.00	7
Don Kenyon	59	2145	145	40.47	6

== Leading bowlers ==
1951 English cricket season – leading bowlers by average
Name	Balls	Maidens	Runs	Wickets	Average
Bob Appleyard	7880	391	2829	200	14.14
Brian Statham	4286	178	1466	97	15.11
Alec Bedser	6600	338	2024	130	15.56
Jim McConnon	5176	238	2186	136	16.07
John Warr	2696	119	1011	59	17.13

1951 English cricket season – leading bowlers by aggregate
Name	Balls	Maidens	Runs	Wickets	Average
Bob Appleyard	7880	391	2829	200	14.14
Jack Young	10022	735	2976	157	18.95
Jim Laker	7809	400	2681	149	17.99
Eric Hollies	8360	500	2566	145	17.69
Roly Jenkins	7147	219	3342	143	23.37

== Annual reviews ==
- Playfair Cricket Annual 1952
- Wisden Cricketers' Almanack 1952
