= Jack Plimsoll =

South African cricketer (1917–1999)

Personal information
- Born: 29 October 1917; Kalk Bay, Cape Province, Union of South Africa
- Died: 11 November 1999 (aged 82); Cape Town, West Cape, South Africa
- Batting: Right-handed
- Bowling: Left-arm medium-fast

International information
- National side: South Africa
- Only Test: 5 July 1947 v England

Career statistics
Competition	Test	First-class
Matches	1	39
Runs scored	16	386
Batting average	16.00	11.35
100s/50s	0/0	0/1
Top score	8	51
Balls bowled	237	10,767
Wickets	3	155
Bowling average	47.66	23.10
5 wickets in innings	0	9
10 wickets in match	0	3
Best bowling	3/128	7/35
Catches/stumpings	0/–	9/–
- Source: CricketArchive, 15 November 2022

John Bruce Plimsoll (27 October 1917 – 11 November 1999) was a South African cricketer who played in one Test match in 1947, against England in Manchester.

Attended St George's Grammar School for his early years of education, matriculating in 1935.

A left-arm opening bowler, he played for Western Province from 1939–40 to 1947–48, and Natal in 1948–49 and 1949–50. His best innings figures were 7 for 35 against Griqualand West in 1946–47, when he bowled throughout the innings to dismiss Griqualand West for 64.

On the tour to England in 1947 he took 68 wickets in 18 matches at 23.32. In three successive matches against Combined Services, Northamptonshire and Somerset he took 28 wickets at 11.85; in the first innings against Northamptonshire he bowled unchanged throughout the innings for figures of 27.3–8–40–6.

He was the manager of the South African team to England in 1965. The captain, Peter van der Merwe, said, "the fact that our tour was so happy and incident-free was very much due to him. He was an outstanding manager." He was appointed to manage the tour to England in 1970, but the tour was cancelled. By profession he was the manager of a building society.
