= Clif Cary =

Australian cricket reporter

Clif Cary was an Australian cricket reporter of the 1930s and 1940s. He was the "sports editor on the commercial radio network with the largest sports audience in the Commonwealth" and in 1946 he published Cricket Tests & Records, "a splendid, authentic and comprehensive history of the many great Anglo-Australian matches" from 1876 to 1938. He was a cricket commentator for the radio station 2UE for the 1946–47 Ashes series. His 1948 book Cricket Controversy, Test matches in Australia 1946-47 is an account of the series in which he was critical of the poor selection of the England team, Wally Hammond's uninspired leadership, Don Bradman's overeagerness to win, which Cary thought verged on gamesmanship, and the mistakes made by the Australian umpires George Borwick and John Scott. Along with Jack Fingleton he was regarded as one of Bradman's critics, even though he admired his batting.
