= Tom Dollery =

English cricketer (1914–1987)

Personal information
- Full name: Thomas Edgar Dollery
- Born: 14 October 1914; Reading, Berkshire, England
- Died: 20 January 1987 (aged 72); Edgbaston, Birmingham, England
- Batting: Right-handed

International information
- National side: England
- Test debut (cap 318): 7 June 1947 v South Africa
- Last Test: 8 June 1950 v West Indies

Career statistics
| Competition | Test | First-class |
|---|---|---|
| Matches | 4 | 436 |
| Runs scored | 72 | 24,414 |
| Batting average | 10.28 | 37.50 |
| 100s/50s | 0/0 | 50/128 |
| Top score | 37 | 212 |
| Balls bowled | – | 48 |
| Wickets | – | 0 |
| Bowling average | – | – |
| 5 wickets in innings | – | – |
| 10 wickets in match | – | – |
| Best bowling | – | – |
| Catches/stumpings | 1/– | 290/14 |
- Source: Cricinfo, 16 July 2020

Tom Dollery (14 October 1914 – 20 January 1987) was an English cricketer, who played for the England cricket team and Warwickshire County Cricket Club.

== Life and career ==
Thomas Edgar Dollery was born in Reading, Berkshire, and educated at Reading School. He was playing Minor counties cricket for Berkshire at the age of 15, Dollery joined Warwickshire in 1934, and was a mainstay of the team until retirement in 1955. His forceful middle order batting earned him more than 1,000 runs in 15 consecutive first-class seasons from 1935 to 1955.

Dollery's principal claim to fame, though, was as one of the first professional captains in English first-class cricket, and certainly the first successful one. Appointed joint Warwickshire captain in 1948, he took sole charge the following year and retained the post for seven seasons. In 1951, he led the county to their first County Championship title since 1911, and only their second ever.

Wisden reported that Dollery's influence as captain was fundamental to the success. It wrote: "He possessed that rare gift of being a born leader of men both on and off the field. He united his team in a cheerful confidence and behind it all he was a shrewd tactician, particularly in the field, where he exploited the weaknesses of the opposition." It also stated: "Dollery believes that by living among his team the professional captain knows more about his men than can the amateur who stays separately. In fact, he says that sometimes he has arrived in the dressing-room on the morning of the match and sensed which bowler is likely to be off form, or to do well."

He wrote in detail about Warwickshire's success in 1951 and the complexities of first-class cricket in a book, Professional Captain (1952). Reviewing it in The Cricketer, G. D. Martineau described it as "one of the most shrewdly informative books ever written about cricket ... an unprecedented vade-mecum for the spectator".

Dollery's highest score came in 1952 with 212 against Leicestershire. In the field he patrolled cover, later preferring slip, although in 1947 he spent half of the season as a makeshift wicket-keeper.

Dollery's career in Test matches was less successful. He played for England four times between 1947 and 1950, but scored only 72 runs in seven innings.

He was one of the Wisden Cricketers of the Year in 1952, particularly for his efforts as the first professional to lead a side to the Championship in 1951.

Following retirement from cricket, Tom and his wife Jean became the stewards at Edgbaston Golf Club and he was landlord of The Falcon pub in Haseley, Warwickshire. Their granddaughter, Abi, married the Warwickshire and England cricketer, Jonathan Trott, in April 2009.
