= Ian Smith (South African cricketer) =

South African cricketer (1925–2015)

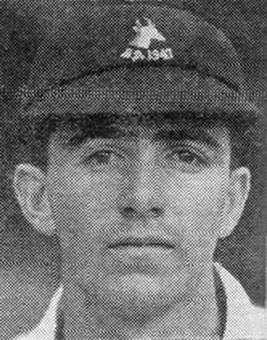
- Smith in 1947

Personal information
- Born: 23 February 1925
- Died: 25 August 2015 (aged 90)
- Batting: Right-handed
- Bowling: Legbreak

International information
- National side: South Africa
- Test debut: 7 June 1947 v England
- Last Test: 23 December 1957 v Australia

Career statistics
Competition	Test	First-class
Matches	9	97
Runs scored	39	547
Batting average	3.89	10.32
100s/50s	0/0	0/0
Top score	11*	37
Balls bowled	1,655	22,088
Wickets	12	365
Bowling average	64.08	22.55
5 wickets in innings	0	26
10 wickets in match	0	8
Best bowling	4/143	9/88
Catches/stumpings	3/–	37/–
- Source: CricketArchive, 13 November 2022

Vivian Ian Smith (23 February 1925 – 25 August 2015) was a South African cricketer who played in nine Test matches from 1947 to 1957 and was educated at Hilton College. He was born in Durban, Natal.

Smith was a right-arm leg-break bowler and lower-order right-handed batsman. He made his Test debut in England in 1947, playing four Tests in the series. He played three Tests against Australia in South Africa in 1949–50, one Test in England in 1955, and a final Test against Australia in South Africa in 1957–58. On his debut, against England at Nottingham in the First Test in 1947, he took 3 for 46 and 4 for 143. His eight subsequent Tests produced only five wickets. He played for Natal from 1945–46 to 1957–58. His best bowling figures were 9 for 88 (12 for 194 in the match) against Border in 1946–47. Smith died in 2015.
