= Dennis Dyer =

South African cricketer

Personal information
- Born: 2 May 1914; Durban, Natal
- Died: 16 June 1990 (aged 76); Durban, Natal
- Batting: Right-handed
- Bowling: Slow left-arm orthodox

International information
- National side: South Africa
- Test debut: 5 July 1947 v England
- Last Test: 16 August 1947 v England

Career statistics
Competition	Test	First-class
Matches	3	34
Runs scored	96	1725
Batting average	16.00	37.50
100s/50s	0/1	3/7
Top score	62	185
Catches/stumpings	0/–	20/–
- Source: Cricinfo, 13 November 2022

Dennis Victor Dyer (2 May 1914 – 16 June 1990) was a South African cricketer who played in 3 Tests in 1947.

Dyer, a product of Durban High School, was a powerfully built right-hand opening batsman with immense patience. He announced himself on his first-class debut with an innings of 185 for Natal against Western Province in 1939–40, but then lost the next six years to the Second World War.

He re-established himself in the 1945–46 and 1946–47 seasons with further centuries and much was expected of him on the 1947 tour of England, when he was slated to open with Bruce Mitchell. But he began the tour so badly that the captain, Alan Melville, opened in the first two Tests himself. When Dyer finally came into the side for the Third Test at Manchester, he scored 62 in three hours, and retained his place for the final two Tests, but did little else. Towards the end of the tour, he had an emergency operation for appendicitis and it was revealed that he had felt ill for much of the tour.

Dyer played for Natal against the English cricket tourists in 1948–49, but retired at the end of that season.

Dyer's two sons, David and Graham, also played first-class cricket for Natal and for other South African teams.
