= Harold Butler (cricketer) =

English cricketer

Personal information
- Full name: Harold James Butler
- Born: 12 March 1913; Clifton, Nottinghamshire, England
- Died: 17 July 1991 (aged 78); Lenton, Nottinghamshire, England
- Batting: Right-handed
- Bowling: Right-arm fast-medium

International information
- National side: England
- Test debut: 26 July 1947 v South Africa
- Last Test: 11 February 1948 v West Indies

Career statistics
Competition	Test	First-class
Matches	2	319
Runs scored	15	2,962
Batting average	15.00	10.54
100s/50s	0/0	0/4
Top score	15*	62
Balls bowled	552	56,935
Wickets	12	952
Bowling average	17.91	24.44
5 wickets in innings	0	46
10 wickets in match	0	6
Best bowling	4/34	8/15
Catches/stumpings	1/–	112/–
- Source: CricInfo, 7 November 2022

Harold James Butler (12 March 1913 – 17 July 1991) was an English fast-medium bowler, who was the best bowler for Nottinghamshire during the period on either side of World War II. This period was one of major decline for the county, which fell from over fifty years near the top of the table to one of the lower-ranked counties, largely because the pitches at Trent Bridge were placid in dry weather and recovered quickly after rain, so that the spin bowlers, upon whom most English counties relied in the 1940s, were practically helpless there. Cricket correspondent, Colin Bateman, stated Butler was a "burly swing bowler... [and] had every reason to feel let down by England".

== Life and career ==
Harold James Butler was born in March 1913 in Clifton, Nottinghamshire.

Butler was expected to compensate for the loss of Harold Larwood to retirement after persistent injuries, and the decline of Bill Voce's powers, but although a fine bowler, he was not as fast as Larwood although similar in pace to Voce. Butler's chief merit lay in his accuracy and ability to move the ball off the seam, and vary his length according to the conditions, as shown when he went on his only overseas tour to the West Indies. His physical strength, however, was always doubtful and he suffered from injury.

Butler first played for Nottinghamshire in 1933, and took five for 36 against Yorkshire. After that, he was in and out of the eleven until 1937, when his eight for 15 against Surrey made his place secure. In 1938, he was heading the first-class averages when illness ended his season, but the following year took 105 wickets. However, his career was interrupted by World War II, during which he served in India and played two first-class matches.

In 1946, with England's formidable pre-war pace bowling gone, Butler bowled well enough, but he was judged unable to withstand the rock-hard Australian pitches and was left at home. In 1947, he was selected for the fourth Test at Old Trafford against the South Africans and bowled well, taking 7 for 66. Although injury kept him out of the fifth Test at The Oval, Butler took 106 wickets that season. He was chosen to tour the West Indies, but after bowling well in one Test, a calf injury and malaria kept him out of the others.

Apart from 1950, when his bowling brought 95 wickets, the rest of Butler's career was a succession of injuries, and at the beginning of 1954 he was advised by his doctor to retire. His career wicket taking average of 24.44 was not exceptional, but Trent Bridge pitches were placid compared to other county grounds.

Butler died in July 1991, in Lenton, Nottinghamshire, at the age of 78.
