= Johnny Lindsay =

South African cricketer

Personal information
- Full name: John Dixon Lindsay
- Born: 8 September 1908; Barkly East, Cape Colony
- Died: 31 August 1990 (aged 81); Benoni, Transvaal, South Africa
- Batting: Right-handed
- Role: Wicket-keeper

International information
- National side: South Africa
- Test debut: 7 June 1947 v England
- Last Test: 5 July 1947 v England

Career statistics
Competition	Test	First-class
Matches	3	29
Runs scored	21	346
Batting average	7.00	11.16
100s/50s	0/0	0/1
Top score	9*	51
Catches/stumpings	4/1	39/16
- Source: Cricinfo, 11 August 2021

John Dixon Lindsay (8 September 1908 – 31 August 1990) was a South African cricketer who played in three Tests in 1947. He was a right-handed batsman and wicket-keeper. His son, Denis, also played Test cricket for South Africa.

He captained North Eastern Transvaal in their initial first-class season in 1937–38.
