= George Fullerton (cricketer) =

South African cricketer (1922–2002)

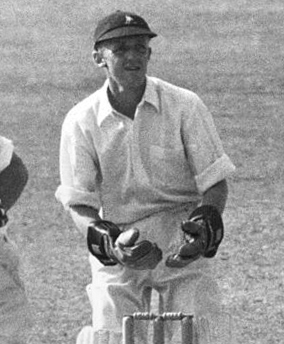

Personal information
- Born: 8 December 1922; Kensington, South Africa
- Died: 19 November 2002 (aged 79); Rondebosch, Cape Town
- Batting: Right-handed
- Bowling: Right-arm medium

International information
- National side: South Africa
- Test debut: 26 July 1947 v England
- Last Test: 5 July 1951 v England

Career statistics
| Competition | Test | First-class |
|---|---|---|
| Matches | 7 | 63 |
| Runs scored | 325 | 2768 |
| Batting average | 25.00 | 31.10 |
| 100s/50s | 0/3 | 3/20 |
| Top score | 88 | 167 |
| Balls bowled | – | 306 |
| Wickets | – | 3 |
| Bowling average | – | 35.66 |
| 5 wickets in innings | – | 0 |
| 10 wickets in match | – | 0 |
| Best bowling | – | 2/41 |
| Catches/stumpings | 10/2 | 64/18 |
- Source: Cricinfo, 15 November 2022

George Murray Fullerton (8 December 1922 – 19 November 2002) was a South African cricketer who played in seven Tests from 1947 to 1951.
