= Noel Mahony =

Irish sportsman, cricketer, later coach and administrator

Personal information
- Full name: Noel Cameron Mahony
- Born: 15 January 1913; Fermoy, Ireland
- Died: 28 December 2006 (aged 93); Lucan, Leinster, Ireland
- Batting: Right-handed

Domestic team information
- Years: Team
- 1948–1953: Ireland

Career statistics
Competition	First-class
Matches	5
Runs scored	116
Batting average	11.60
100s/50s	–/–
Top score	29
Balls bowled	0
Wickets	–
Bowling average	–
5 wickets in innings	–
10 wickets in match	–
Best bowling	–
Catches/stumpings	3/–
- Source: Cricinfo, 3 November 2018

Noel Cameron Mahony (15 January 1913 – 28 December 2006) was an Irish first-class cricketer, cricket coach and administrator. He also played rugby union and table tennis competitively.

== Life ==
=== Early life ===
Mahony was born at Fermoy in County Cork in January 1913, and was educated in Dublin at The King's Hospital. From King's Hospital, he went up to Trinity College, Dublin. After completing his studies, where alongside his degree he gained a teaching qualification, Mahony began teaching mathematics at King's Hospital.

=== Cricket playing career ===
Mahony played his club cricket for Dublin University Cricket Club, and during the summer holidays, Cork County. He also played for Civil Service (Dublin), but did not remain long at the club. He joined Clontarf in 1938, where he would remain playing regular club cricket until 1955, and sporadically until 1963.

He made his debut in first-class cricket for Ireland against Scotland at Glasgow in 1948. He played first-class cricket for Ireland until 1954, making a total of five appearances, his last coming against Glamorgan at Margam during Ireland's tour of England and Wales. Across his five first-class matches, Mahony scored 116 runs at an average of 11.60, with a highest score of 29.

For the two months prior to his death, Mahony was the oldest living Irish first-class cricketer, following the death of Ham Lambert.

=== Cricket coaching and administration ===
Following his retirement from playing, Mahony kept his association with Irish cricket. He was the first qualified Irish cricket coach, helping to set up a network of cricket coaches across Ireland and later becoming Ireland's first director of coaching. He coached the Ireland women's cricket team in their first ever World Cup in 1988.

Mahony served as president of the Irish Cricket Union in 1979.

Lead a ladies cricket team to Trinidad & Tobago in 1987 or 1988?

=== Rugby union and table tennis ===
Outside of cricket, Mahony was also a capable rugby union player, representing both Cork-based Dolphin and Dublin-based Clontarf.

Mahony played table tennis at interprovincial level.

=== Personal life ===
Married to Joan

Esteemed member of Hermitage Golf Club

He died, two weeks shy of his 94th birthday, in (28th?) December 2006.

Super Maths Teacher.
