= William Laidlaw (cricketer) =

Scottish cricketer born in Edinburgh, Midlothian

Personal information
- Full name: William Kennedy Laidlaw
- Born: 26 August 1912; Edinburgh, Midlothian, Scotland
- Died: 4 June 1992 (aged 79); Edinburgh, Midlothian, Scotland
- Batting: Right-handed
- Bowling: Leg break googly

International information
- National side: Scotland

Domestic team information
- Years: Team
- 1950: Minor Counties
- 1948–1952: Durham
- 1938–1953: Scotland

Career statistics
Competition	First-class
Matches	17
Runs scored	132
Batting average	7.33
100s/50s	–/–
Top score	25
Balls bowled	2,558
Wickets	42
Bowling average	29.16
5 wickets in innings	2
10 wickets in match	–
Best bowling	7/70
Catches/stumpings	8/–
- Source: Cricinfo, 10 August 2011

William Kennedy Laidlaw (26 August 1912 – 4 June 1992) was a Scottish cricketer. Laidlaw was a right-handed batsman who bowled leg break googly. He was born in Edinburgh, Midlothian and was educated at Melville College.

Laidlaw made his first-class debut for Scotland against Yorkshire in 1938. His debut was an overwhelming success, with Laidlaw taking 7 wickets in the Yorkshire first-innings for the cost of 70 runs. He played first-class cricket for Scotland either side of World War II, making a total of 15 appearances, with his final match coming against Ireland in 1953 in Belfast. A bowler, Laidlaw took 40 wickets at an average of 26.62, with two five wicket hauls, although he never managed to better the figures he took against Yorkshire in 1938. His other five wicket haul came against Ireland in 1949.

His performances for Scotland caught the eye of Durham, then a minor county. He made his debut for Durham in the 1948 Minor Counties Championship against Northumberland, with Laidlaw making a total of 26 appearances between 1948 and 1952. In 1950, he played his final two first-class matches when representing the Minor Counties against the Marylebone Cricket Club and the touring West Indians.

Outside of cricket, he worked as an accountant. He died in the city of his birth on 4 June 1992.
