= List of tied first-class cricket matches =

In the sport of cricket, a tie occurs when the match is concluded with each team having scored exactly the same number of runs, and the team batting last having completed its second innings. The definition of a completed innings is all ten batsmen having been dismissed, or the pre-determined number of overs having been bowled. It has been on rare occasions only that an important or first-class match has ended in a tie. In more than 300 years since the earliest important matches were played, there have been 70, including two in Test matches.

== Earliest known ties ==
The earliest known instance of a tie is in a single wicket "threes" match at Lamb's Conduit Field on Wednesday, 1 September 1736. Three London players were matched against three of Surrey. Although the sources give different totals for each innings, they are agreed that both teams totalled 23 overall. London batted first and scored either 4 and 19, or 3 and 18. Surrey replied with either 18 and 5, or 17 and 6. Five years later, the same two teams produced the earliest known tie in an important eleven-a-side match.

In 1948, the Imperial Cricket Conference (the ICC) ruled that if scores are level when scheduled play ends, but the team batting last still has wickets in hand, the result is a draw, and not a tie. There had previously been ties in which the final innings was incomplete.

== Famous tied matches ==
The two tied Tests both ended on the penultimate ball of the match. In 1960–61, Australia v West Indies finished with a run out on ball 7 of 8. In 1986–87, India v Australia finished on ball 5 of 6 in the final over of play. In 2024, the match between Gloucestershire and Glamorgan was tied on the last possible ball of the match.

In January 2021, the 2020–21 Quaid-e-Azam Trophy final ended as a tie, the first time it had occurred in a domestic first-class cricket tournament final.

== List ==
Below is a list of all important and first-class matches that have been declared tied, including those before 1948 which would have been draws in the modern era.

=== Surrey v London 1741 ===
Surrey
unknown
&
unknown
Tie

Richmond Green, London
Umpires: unknown

London
unknown
&
unknown

=== London v Bromley 1742 ===
London
unknown
&
unknown
Tie

Artillery Ground, London
Umpires: unknown

Bromley
unknown
&
unknown

=== Hampshire v Kent 1783 ===
Hampshire
140
&
62
Tie

Thomas Taylor 51
William Bullen 4/?

Noah Mann 13
William Bullen 2/?

Windmill Down, Hambledon, Hampshire
Umpires: unknown

Kent
111
&
91

William Brazier 27
Lumpy Stevens 2/?

James Aylward 27
Lumpy Stevens 2/?

=== MCC v Oxford & Cambridge Universities 1839 ===
Oxford and Cambridge Universities
115
&
61
Tie

Joseph Grout 28
James Cobbett 8/?

John Wynne 20
John Bayley 6/?

Lord's Cricket Ground, London, England
Umpires: unknown

Marylebone Cricket Club
69
&
107

Roger Kynaston 21
Edward Sayres 5/?

Roger Kynaston 28
Edward Sayres 5/?

=== Surrey v Kent 1847 ===
1–3 July 1847
Scorecard

Surrey	v	Kent
112; Nicholas Felix 46*; William Hillyer 6/?		127; Fuller Pilch 29; Daniel Day 3/? William Martingell 3/? George Brockwell 3/?
160; James Chester 36; William Hillyer 4/?		145; William Pilch 36; Daniel Day 6/?

Match tied
The Oval, London
Umpires: ? and T. S. Mortlock

=== Surrey v MCC 1868 ===
MCC
175
&
122
Tie

Francis Baker 53
George Griffith 5/73

E. M. Grace 53
John Bristow 6/49

Kennington Oval, London, England
Umpires: Julius Caesar and G. Street

Surrey
204
&
93

Ted Pooley 50
Frank Farrands 3/72

Will Mortlock 32
George Wootton 6/49

=== Surrey v Middlesex 1868 ===
Middlesex
112
&
167
Tie

Charles Green 44
James Street 6/51

Henry Richardson 56
James Southerton 7/82

Kennington Oval, London, England
Umpires: Julius Caesar and W. Inwood

Surrey
93
&
186

George Griffith 31
George Howitt 5/16

Thomas Humphrey 52
Edward Rutter 6/68

=== Wellington v Nelson 1873/74 ===
Wellington
63
&
118
Tie

Nathaniel Werry 16
Charles Knapp 5/25

Charles Knapp 37
Christopher Cross 4/33

Basin Reserve, Wellington, New Zealand
Umpires: ? and W. J. Jordan

Nelson
111
&
70

Harry Halliday 35
Isaac Salmon 6/22

Christopher Cross 18
Isaac Salmon 7/36

=== Surrey v Middlesex 1876 ===
Middlesex
138
&
322
Tie

Arthur Burghes 44
James Southerton 5/38

Russell Walker 104
James Southerton 3/88

Kennington Oval, London, England
Umpires: George Howitt and Tom Humphrey

Surrey
215
&
245

Walter Read 94
Robert Henderson 6/66

Ted Barratt 67
Michael Flanagan 3/46

=== Gentlemen v Players 1883 ===
Players
203
&
181
Tie

George Ulyett 63
Hugh Rotherham 6/41

Billy Bates 76
A. G. Steel 7/43

Kennington Oval, London, England
Umpires: Harry Jupp and James Street

Gentlemen
235
&
149

Lord Harris 38
Billy Barnes 3/48

Bunny Lucas 47
Wilfred Flowers 6/40

=== Surrey v Lancashire 1894 ===
Surrey
97
&
124
Tie

Alfred Street 48
Johnny Briggs 7/46

Walter Read 33*
Johnny Briggs 6/47

Kennington Oval, London, England
Umpires: Henry Draper and Edward Henty

Lancashire
147
&
74

Sidney Tindall 49
Tom Richardson 5/52

Charles Smith 21
William Lockwood 6/30

=== Worcestershire v South Africans 1901 ===
South Africans
293
&
140
Tie

Maitland Hathorn 90
George Wilson 5/123

Louis Tancred 34
George Wilson 5/39

New Road, Worcester, England
Umpires: George Bean and Valentine Titchmarsh

Worcestershire
224
&
209

Arthur Bannister 44
Johannes Kotze 6/82

George Simpson-Hayward 52
Robert Graham 8/90

=== Middlesex v South Africans 1904 ===
Middlesex
272
&
225
Tie

Bernard Bosanquet 110
Johannes Kotze 5/94

Bernard Bosanquet 44
Reggie Schwarz 5/48

Lord's, London, England
Umpires: William Attewell and Thomas Mycroft

South Africans
287
&
210

Frank Mitchell 66
Albert Trott 4/80

Louis Tancred 75
Albert Trott 6/75

=== Lancashire v England 1905 ===
England
193
&
228/6 dec.
Tie

John Gunn 50
James Hallows 4/55

George Gunn 48
Frank Harry 3/47

Stanley Park, Blackpool, England
Umpires: Dick Barlow and William West

Lancashire
253
&
168/7

Archie MacLaren 93
George Gunn 3/49

Frank Harry 64*
John Gunn 3/51

=== Surrey v Kent 1905 ===
Kent
202
&
84
Tie

Sam Day 61
Razor Smith 5/63

Sam Day 26
Walter Lees 7/29

Kennington Oval, London, England
Umpires: Thomas Mycroft and A. White

Surrey
125
&
161

Jack Crawford 31
Colin Blythe 5/45

Tom Hayward 40
Colin Blythe 6/47

=== MCC v Leicestershire 1907 ===
Marylebone Cricket Club
371
&
69
Tie

Len Braund 137
William Odell 4/76

Len Braund 19
Thomas Jayes 5/31

Lord's Cricket Ground, London, England
Umpires: William Attewell and George Bean

Leicestershire
239
&
201

Samuel Coe 100
Claude Buckenham 4/74

Samuel Coe 66
Bill Reeves 4/52

=== Jamaica v MCC 1910/11 ===
Marylebone Cricket Club
269
&
131
Tie

Sydney Smith 81
Tommy Scott 6/77

Tom Whittington 34
Tommy Scott 5/61

Sabina Park, Kingston, Jamaica
Umpires: unknown

Jamaica
173
&
227

Joseph Holt 39
Sydney Smith 5/35

Thomas Nicholson 49
Sydney Smith 4/35

=== Somerset v Sussex 1919 ===
Somerset
243
&
103
Tie

Dudley Rippon 60
George Cox 5/51

Jimmy Bridges 14
George Cox 4/26

County Ground, Taunton, England
Umpires: Frederick G. Roberts and Alfred Street

Sussex
242
&
104

Maurice Tate 69
Jimmy Bridges 5/84

Herbert Wilson 42*
Jimmy Bridges 3/32

=== Orange Free State v Eastern Province 1925/26 ===
Orange Free State
100
&
349
Tie

Shunter Coen 42
Arthur Ochse 5/26

Ryeford Dick 56
Kenneth McRobert 4/68

Ramblers Cricket Club Ground, Bloemfontein, South Africa
Umpires: Unknown

Eastern Province
225
&
224/8

Southey Stirk 48
Bernard Susskind 3/41

Campbell Munro 39
Joseph Abell 2/8

=== Essex v Somerset 1926 ===
Somerset
208
&
107
Tie

Jack MacBryan 80
Jack Russell 3/39

Box Case 23*
Laurie Eastman 6/59

County Cricket Ground, Chelmsford, England
Umpires: Frank Chester and Jimmy Stone

Essex
178
&
137/9

John Freeman 43
Jack White 5/57

John Freeman 37
Jimmy Bridges 5/33

=== Gloucestershire v Australians 1930 ===
Gloucestershire
72
&
202
Tie

Frederick Seabrook 19
Percy Hornibrook 4/20

Wally Hammond 89
Percy Hornibrook 5/49

County Cricket Ground, Bristol, England
Umpires: Walter Buswell and Bill Huddleston

Australians
157
&
117

Bill Ponsford 51
Tom Goddard 5/52

Stan McCabe 34
Charlie Parker 7/54

=== Victoria v MCC 1932/33 ===
Marylebone Cricket Club
321
&
183/9 dec.
Tie

Maurice Tate 94
Bert Ironmonger 3/82

Wally Hammond 64
Bert Ironmonger 5/31

Melbourne Cricket Ground, Australia
Umpires: A. Barlow and W. Moore

Victoria
327
&
177/3

Len Darling 103
Freddie Brown 3/63

Keith Rigg 88
Bill Bowes 2/56

=== Worcestershire v Somerset 1939 ===
Worcestershire
130
&
142
Tie

Edwin Cooper 69
Arthur Wellard 7/45

Dick Howorth 45
Horace Hazell 5/6

Chester Road North Ground, Kidderminster, England
Umpires: Ernest Cooke and John Smart

Somerset
131
&
141

Bertie Buse 26
Reg Perks 4/40

Peter McRae 28
Dick Howorth 4/27

=== Southern Punjab v Baroda 1945/46 ===
Southern Punjab
167
&
146
Tie

Lala Amarnath 91
Vijay Hazare 5/52

Maqsood Ahmed 56
Vijay Hazare 5/53

Baradari Ground, Patiala, India
Umpires: Idrees Baig and Shujauddin Siddiqi

Baroda
106
&
207

Hemu Adhikari 18
Shankarrao Powar 18
Aftab Ahmed 6/37

Raosaheb Nimbalkar 52
Lala Amarnath 4/44

=== Essex v Northamptonshire 1947 ===
Northamptonshire
215
&
291
Tie

Vincent Broderick 49
Peter Smith 4/65

John Timms 112
Peter Smith 6/84

Valentines Park, London, England
Umpires: Herbert Baldwin and Frank Chester

Essex
267
&
239

Chick Cray 100
Nobby Clark 3/42

Len Clark 64
Vincent Broderick 4/48

=== Hampshire v Lancashire 1947 ===
Hampshire
363
&
224/7 dec.
Tie

Jim Bailey 95
Ken Cranston 4/73

Jim Bailey 63
William Roberts 2/30

Dean Park Cricket Ground, Bournemouth, England
Umpires: H. Cruice and Fred Root

Lancashire
367/9 dec.
&
220

Ken Cranston 155*
Victor Ransom 3/68

Cyril Washbrook 105
Jim Bailey 6/82

=== D. G. Bradman's XI v A. L. Hassett's XI 1948/49 ===
A. L. Hassett's XI
406
&
430
Tie

Ray Lindwall 104
Sam Loxton 3/39

Lindsay Hassett 102
Doug Ring 3/150

Melbourne Cricket Ground, Australia
Umpires: A. Barlow and R. Wright

D. G. Bradman's XI
434
&
402/9

Donald Bradman 123
Colin McCool 5/101

Don Tallon 146*
Ray Lindwall 3/32

=== Hampshire v Kent 1950 ===
Kent
162
&
170
Tie

Godfrey Evans 71
Charlie Knott 4/49

Les Ames 55 (retired hurt)
Charlie Knott 5/46

County Ground, Southampton, England
Umpires: Herbert Baldwin and Frank Lee

Hampshire
180
&
152

Clifford Walker 46
Doug Wright 6/91

John Arnold 52
Alan Shirreff 3/27

=== Sussex v Warwickshire 1952 ===
Warwickshire
138
&
116
Tie

Tom Dollery 55
Ted James 3/16

Alan Townsend 41
Jim Wood 4/40

County Cricket Ground, Hove, England
Umpires: Joe Hills and Fred Price

Sussex
123
&
131

John Langridge 65
Charles Grove 4/42

George Cox 27
Charles Oakes 27
Charles Grove 6/49

=== Essex v Lancashire 1952 ===
Lancashire
266
&
226/7 dec.
Tie

Alan Wharton 85
Ken Preston 5/49

Geoff Edrich 69
Ray Smith 6/122

Old County Ground, Brentwood, England
Umpires: Tom Spencer and C. H. Welch

Essex
261
&
231

Bill Greensmith 56
Geoff Lomax 3/37

Trevor Bailey 52
Roy Tattersall 4/61

=== Northamptonshire v Middlesex 1953 ===
Middlesex
96
&
312
Tie

Bill Edrich 55
Robert Clarke 5/31

Denis Compton 100
Freddie Brown 6/71

Town Ground, Peterborough, England
Umpires: K. McCanlis and H. Palmer

Northamptonshire
182
&
226

Dennis Brookes 53
Alan Moss 3/61

Des Barrick 80*
Alan Moss 5/68

=== Yorkshire v Leicestershire 1954 ===
Yorkshire
351/4 dec.
&
113
Tie

Vic Wilson 138
Jack Walsh 2/77

Ted Lester 34
Terry Spencer 9/63

Fartown, Huddersfield, England
Umpires: Ernest Cooke and Harry Elliott

Leicestershire
328
&
136

Maurice Tompkin 149
Johnny Wardle 4/82

Charles Palmer 31
Victor Munden 31
Fred Trueman 4/44

=== Sussex v Hampshire 1955 ===
Sussex
172
&
120
Tie

John Langridge 48
Derek Shackleton 4/45

Robin Marlar 23
Derek Shackleton 5/42

The Saffrons, Eastbourne, England
Umpires: Ernest Cooke and Harry Elliott

Hampshire
153
&
139

Henry Horton 40
Ted James 4/60

Alan Rayment 30
Ted James 5/49

=== Victoria v New South Wales 1956/57 ===
Victoria
244
&
197
Tie

Ian Meckiff 55
Richie Benaud 4/67

John Shaw 52
John Treanor 5/36

St Kilda Cricket Ground, Melbourne, Australia
Umpires: J. Ward and R. Wright

New South Wales
281
&
160

Jim Burke 132*
Ian Meckiff 3/65

Richie Benaud 63
Lindsay Kline 6/57

=== T. N. Pearce's XI v New Zealanders 1958 ===
New Zealanders
268
&
303/8 dec.
Tie

Bert Sutcliffe 77
Peter Sainsbury 4/91

John Sparling 85
Peter Sainsbury 4/58

North Marine Road, Scarborough, England
Umpires: Buddy Oldfield and Alec Skelding

T. N. Pearce's XI
313/7 dec.
&
258

Peter May 131
Bert Sutcliffe 3/67

Godfrey Evans 69
Johnny Hayes 5/72

=== Essex v Gloucestershire 1959 ===
Essex
364/6 dec.
&
176/8 dec.
Tie

Doug Insole 177*
Tony Brown 3/66

Doug Insole 90
Tony Brown 4/60

Leyton Cricket Ground, Leyton, England
Umpires: Arthur Fagg and Tom Spencer

Gloucestershire
329
&
211

Arthur Milton 99
Barry Knight 4/69

Tony Brown 91
Barry Knight 4/64

=== Australia v West Indies 1960/61 ===
West Indies
453
&
284
Tie

Garfield Sobers 132
Alan Davidson 5/135

Frank Worrell 65
Alan Davidson 6/87

Brisbane Cricket Ground, Australia
Umpires: Colin Egar and Col Hoy

Australia
505
&
232

Norm O'Neill 181
Wes Hall 4/140

Alan Davidson 80
Wes Hall 5/63

=== Bahawalpur v Lahore B 1961/62 ===
Lahore B
127
&
278
Tie

Hameed Hussain 48
Ghiasuddin Ahmed 6/40

Abdul Quddus 49
Naseer Ahmed 2/8

Bahawal Stadium, Pakistan
Umpires: Gulzar Mir and Nazar Mohammad

Bahawalpur
123
&
282

Hasan Ahmed 31
Mohammad Hafeez 5/32

Javed Bhatti 141
Zafar Waqar 3/56

=== Hampshire v Middlesex 1967 ===
Middlesex
327/5 dec.
&
123/9 dec.
Tie

Michael Smith 135*
Butch White 3/80

Clive Radley 46*
Keith Wheatley 3/26

United Services Recreation Ground, Portsmouth, England
Umpires: John Langridge and Cec Pepper

Hampshire
277
&
173

David Turner 87
John Price 3/77

Richard Gilliat 37
Bob Herman 4/44

=== England XI v England Under-25s 1968 ===
England XI
312/8 dec.
&
190/3 dec.
Tie

Doug Padgett 100
Derek Underwood 4/90

Phil Sharpe 88
Derek Underwood 1/9

North Marine Road, Scarborough, England
Umpires: Syd Buller and Eddie Phillipson

England Under-25s
320/9 dec.
&
182

Keith Fletcher 112
Robin Hobbs 4/98

Clive Radley 39
Ray Illingworth 5/53

=== Yorkshire v Middlesex 1973 ===
Middlesex
102
&
211
Tie

John Murray 21
Tony Nicholson 5/23

Mike Brearley 83
Don Wilson 4/67

Park Avenue, Bradford, England
Umpires: Henry Horton and George Pope

Yorkshire
106/9 dec.
&
207

Colin Johnson 33
Larry Gomes 4/22

Colin Johnson 78
Mike Selvey 6/74

=== Sussex v Essex 1974 ===
Sussex
245
&
173/5 dec.
Tie

Peter Graves 114*
Stuart Turner 6/87

Mike Griffith 58
Robin Hobbs 3/72

County Cricket Ground, Hove, England
Umpires: Barrie Meyer and Peter Wight

Essex
200/8 dec.
&
218

Brian Hardie 41
John Snow 2/52

Stuart Turner 69
Uday Joshi 4/79

=== South Australia v Queensland 1976/77 ===
South Australia
431
&
171/7 dec.
Tie

David Hookes 185
Geoff Dymock 5/109

David Hookes 105
Phil Carlson 2/4

Adelaide Oval, Australia
Umpires: Robin Bailhache and Max O'Connell

Queensland
340/8 dec.
&
262

Graham Whyte 93
Geoffrey Attenborough 3/81

Martin Kent 82
Geoffrey Attenborough 3/72

=== Central Districts v England 1977/78 ===
England XI
296/6 dec.
&
104
Tie

Mike Gatting 66
Alistar Jordan 3/38

Geoff Cope 20*
David O'Sullivan 5/14

Pukekura Park, New Plymouth, New Zealand
Umpires: David Kinsella and Steve Woodward

Central Districts
198
&
202

David O'Sullivan 31
Bob Willis 3/45

Terry Horne 40
Bob Willis 2/13

=== Victoria v New Zealanders 1982/83 ===
New Zealand
301/9 dec.
&
174/3 dec.
Tie

Geoff Howarth 102
Len Balcam 3/53

John Reid 58
Rod McCurdy 1/29

Melbourne Cricket Ground, Australia
Umpires: Robin Bailhache and A. Nicosia

Victoria
230/5 dec.
&
245

Dav Whatmore 81
Gary Troup 2/30

Julien Wiener 75
John Morrison 4/62

=== Muslim Commercial Bank v Railways 1983/84 ===
Muslim Commercial Bank
229
&
238
Tie

Asif Ali 74
Naved Anjum 3/59

Azmat Rana 71
Naved Anjum 3/49

Jinnah Stadium Sialkot, Pakistan
Umpires: Unknown

Railways
149
&
318

Talat Mirza 64
Ijaz Faqih 6/42

Manzoor Elahi 53
Ilyas Khan 4/58

=== Sussex v Kent 1984 ===
Kent
92
&
243
Tie

Neil Taylor 50
Colin Wells 5/25

Derek Underwood 111
Colin Wells 3/35

Central Recreation Ground, Hastings, England
Umpires: Dickie Bird and Alan Whitehead

Sussex
143
&
192

Colin Wells 51
Kevin Jarvis 4/34

Colin Wells 81
Terry Alderman 5/60

=== Northamptonshire v Kent 1984 ===
Kent
250/6 dec.
&
204/5 dec.
Tie

Mark Benson, Graham Johnson, Chris Tavaré 45
Duncan Wild 2/24

Neil Taylor 86*
Duncan Wild 3/63

County Cricket Ground, Northampton, England
Umpires: John Holder and Barrie Meyer

Northamptonshire
124
&
330

Geoff Cook 40
Terry Alderman 5/34

Duncan Wild 128
Terry Alderman 3/89

=== Western Province v Eastern Province 1984/85 ===
Eastern Province
109
&
109
Tie

Andre Peters 37
Barney Mohammed 5/33

J. Sandan 39*
Goolam Allie 6/45

Elfindale, Cape Town, South Africa
Umpires: V. J. Farrell and L. February

Western Province
97
&
121

Nasser Antulay 42
Stephen Draai 5/20

Mansoor Abdullah 36
Haroon Lorgat 4/21

=== Eastern Province B v Boland 1985/86 ===
Eastern Province B
189
&
278
Tie

David Capel 54
Omar Henry 4/46

Ian Daniell 116
Ian Callen 4/71

Albany Sports Club, Grahamstown, South Africa
Umpires: Rudi Koertzen and L. Mack

Boland
211
&
256

Stephen Jones 53
Brent Robey 3/36

Carl Spilhaus 82
Anthony Hobson 4/39

=== Natal B v Eastern Province B 1985/86 ===
Natal B
367
&
204/5 dec.
Tie

Craig Lowe 64
Anthony Hobson 7/114

Michael Mellor 45
Anthony Hobson 2/40

Jan Smuts Stadium, Pietermaritzburg, South Africa
Umpires: H. Bruin and B. Smith

Eastern Province B
279
&
292

James Furstenburg 122
John O'Donoghue 5/102

Terance Reid 87
Michael Mellor 2/26

=== India v Australia 1986/87 ===
Australia
574/7 dec.
&
170/5 dec.
Tie

Dean Jones 210
Shivlal Yadav 4/142

David Boon 49
Maninder Singh 3/60

M. A. Chidambaram Stadium, Madras, India
Umpires: Dara Dotiwalla and V. Vikramraju

India
397
&
347

Kapil Dev 119
Greg Matthews 5/103

Sunil Gavaskar 90
Ray Bright 5/94

=== Gloucestershire v Derbyshire 1987 ===
Derbyshire
340
&
226/5 dec.
Tie

Kim Barnett 80
David Lawrence 4/61

Kim Barnett 110
Phil Bainbridge 2/56

The Royal & Sun Alliance County Ground, Bristol, England
Umpires: Ken Palmer and Peter Wight

Gloucestershire
288
&
278

Jeremy Lloyds 66
Roger Finney 3/39

Jeremy Lloyds 64
Reg Sharma 6/80

=== Bahawalpur v Peshawar 1988/89 ===
Peshawar
263/9 dec.
&
249
Tie

Haroon Jan 69
Imran Adil 4/68

Mohammad Sajid 65
Mohammad Zahid 4/69

Bahawal Stadium, Pakistan
Umpires: Bashir Kardar and M. Iqbal

Bahawalpur
325/8 dec.
&
187

Mujahid Usmani 65
Faridoon Khan 4/97

Afzal Kamal 40
Wajid Khan 3/5

=== Wellington v Canterbury 1988/89 ===
Wellington
398
&
250/4 dec.
Tie

Tim Ritchie 106
Stu Roberts 5/115

Andrew Jones 181*
Mark Robinson 2/40

Basin Reserve, Wellington, New Zealand
Umpires: Fred Goodall and Steve Woodward

Canterbury
381
&
267

David Boyle 108
Evan Gray 3/69

John Wright 81
Evan Gray 4/77

=== Sussex v Kent 1991 ===
Kent
381
&
408/7 dec.
Tie

Neil Taylor 111
Ian Salisbury 4/101

Neil Taylor 203*
Tony Dodemaide 4/87

County Cricket Ground, Hove, England
Umpires: Mervyn Kitchen and Bob White

Sussex
353
&
436

Colin Wells 76
Mark Ealham 5/39

Alan Wells 162
Tony Merrick 7/99

=== Nottinghamshire v Worcestershire 1993 ===
Worcestershire
203
&
325/8 dec.
Tie

Tim Curtis 43
Andy Pick 3/28

Tim Curtis 113
Greg Mike 5/65

Trent Bridge, West Bridgford, England
Umpires: Barrie Meyer and Peter Wight

Nottinghamshire
233
&
295

Greg Mike 47
Stuart Lampitt 3/33

Derek Randall 98
Phil Newport 6/63

=== Somerset v West Indies A 2002 ===
West Indies A
370
&
266/7 dec.
Tie

Lendl Simmons 81
Matthew Bulbeck 4/47

Dwayne Bravo 77*
Arul Suppiah 3/46

County Ground, Taunton, England
Umpires: Barry Dudleston and Jeremy Lloyds

Somerset
183
&
453

Matthew Wood 51
Reon King 4/48

Peter Trego 140
Reon King 3/90

=== Warwickshire v Essex 2003 ===
Warwickshire
446/7 dec.
&
Forfeited innings
Tie

Jim Troughton 129*
Scott Brant 3/133

-
–

Edgbaston Cricket Ground, Birmingham, England
Umpires: Roy Palmer and John Steele

Essex
66/0 dec.
&
380

Darren Robinson 42*
–

Ronnie Irani 87
Ashley Giles 5/115

=== Worcestershire v Zimbabweans 2003 ===
Worcestershire
262
&
247
Tie

Vikram Solanki 74
Douglas Hondo 3/53

Andrew Hall 68
Grant Flower 3/25

New Road, Worcester, England
Umpires: Nigel Cowley and Richard Kettleborough

Zimbabweans
334
&
175

Stuart Carlisle 157
Kabir Ali 3/89

Andy Blignaut 42
Kabir Ali 5/48

=== Habib Bank Limited v Water and Power Development Authority 2011/12 ===
8–11 December 2011
Scorecard

Habib Bank Limited	v	Water and Power Development Authority
245 (70. 5 overs); Aftab Alam 63 (80); Imran Khan 5/57 (16. 5 overs)		233 (76. 2 overs); Aamer Sajjad 58 (102); Fahad Masood 4/62 (22 overs)
178 (46. 2 overs); Shan Masood 45 (114); Imran Khan 9/77 (19. 2 overs)		190 (64. 1 overs); Ahmed Said 62 (99); Mohammad Aslam 4/85 (27. 1 overs)

Match tied
Gaddafi Stadium, Lahore
Umpires: Akbar Khan and Riazuddin

- Water and Power Development Authority won the toss and elected to field.

=== Border v Boland 2012/13 ===
11–13 October 2012
Scorecard

Border	v	Boland
210 (49 overs); Darryl Brown 49 (85); Hillroy Paulse 3/34 (11 overs)		219 (63. 4 overs); Emile Kriek 63 (112); Gionne Koopman 5/36 (17. 4 overs)
210 (73. 2 overs); Gionne Koopman 48 (118); Carl Raubenheimer 6/86 (26. 2 overs)		201 (72 overs); Emile Kriek 96 (156); Darryl Brown 6/32 (16 overs)

Match tied
Mercedes Benz Park, East London
Umpires: Ian Howell (SA) and Faizel Samsoodien (SA)

- Boland won the toss and elected to field

=== Police Sports Club v Kalutara Physical Culture Club 2016/17 ===
14–16 January 2017
Scorecard

Police Sports Club	v	Kalutara Physical Culture Club
235 (70. 1 overs); Suwanji Madanayake 96* (177); Jasdeep Singh 4/38 (21 overs)		139 (67 overs); Damidu Ashan 34 (78); Suwanji Madanayake 3/37 (18 overs)
85 (25. 3 overs); Tharindu Dilshan 27 (27); Ruchira Tharindra 7/31 (13 overs)		181 (41. 1 overs); Damidu Ashan 56 (76); Suwanji Madanayake 7/70 (17 overs)

Match tied
Burgher Recreation Club Ground, Colombo
Umpires: Saman Mohan de Silva and Chaminda Hathurusingha

- Kalutara Physical Culture Club won the toss and elected to field.

=== Windward Islands v Guyana 2017/18 ===
7–10 December 2017
Scorecard

Windward Islands	v	Guyana
117 (54. 3 overs); Tyrone Theophile 33 (88); Veerasammy Permaul 5/40 (21. 3 overs)		194 (71. 4 overs); Shivnarine Chanderpaul 59 (120); Shane Shillingford 4/36 (18 overs)
241 (84. 2 overs); Devon Smith 95 (185); Sherfane Rutherford 2/19 (6 overs)		164 (47. 2 overs); Vishaul Singh 56 (95); Shane Shillingford 5/47 (16. 2 overs)

Match tied
Providence Stadium, Guyana
Umpires: Shannon Crawford and Christopher Taylor

- Guyana won the toss and elected to field.

=== Chilaw Marians Cricket Club v Burgher Recreation Club 2017/18 ===
15–17 December 2017
Scorecard

Chilaw Marians Cricket Club	v	Burgher Recreation Club
293 (87. 2 overs); Sachithra Serasinghe 63 (102); Suraj Randiv 6/90 (26 overs)		316 (81. 1 overs); Rumesh Buddika 123 (149); Malinda Pushpakumara 5/102 (32 overs)
117 (43. 4 overs); Sachithra Serasinghe 53 (87); Himesh Ramanayake 5/34 (12. 4 overs)		94 (43. 1 overs); Harsha Vithana 35* (102); Malinda Pushpakumara 5/51 (22 overs)

Match tied
FTZ Sports Complex, Katunayake
Umpires: Rohitha Kottahachchi and Suranga Perera

- Chilaw Marians Cricket Club won the toss and elected to bat.

=== Negambo Cricket Club v Kalutara Town Club 2017/18 ===
28–30 December 2017
Scorecard

Negambo Cricket Club	v	Kalutara Town Club
221 (92. 2 overs); Praveen Fernando 86 (193); Matheesha Perera 5/55 (20. 2 overs)		193 (65. 2 overs); Suresh Niroshan 89 (111); Umega Chaturanga 7/79 (28. 2 overs)
206/8d (71 overs); Sehan Weerasinghe 53* (87); Matheesha Perera 4/95 (25 overs)		234 (44 overs); Geeth Perera 87 (99); Umega Chaturanga 5/112 (22 overs)

Match tied
Kadirana Cricket Grounds, Gampaha
Umpires: S. B. Semasinghe and Ranjith Vishwakula

- Negambo Cricket Club won the toss and elected to bat.

=== Bloomfield Cricket and Athletic Club v Sri Lanka Army Sports Club 2017/18 ===
26–28 January 2018
Scorecard

Bloomfield Cricket and Athletic Club	v	Sri Lanka Army Sports Club
163 (38. 3 overs); Adeesha Nanayakkara 35 (54); Dushan Vimukthi 6/77 (16. 3 overs)		171 (52. 2 overs); Ajantha Mendis 37 (53); Malith de Silva 5/69 (21. 2 overs)
206 (60 overs); Nipun Karunanayake 91 (124); Dushan Vimukthi 4/50 (15 overs)		198 (68 overs); Lakshitha Madushan 58 (144); Malith de Silva 4/61 (28 overs)

Match tied
Moors Sports Club Ground, Colombo
Umpires: Keerthi Bandara and Vidura Prasad

- Sri Lanka Army Sports Club won the toss and elected to field.

=== Lancashire v Somerset 2018 ===
4–5 September 2018

Lancashire	v	Somerset
99 (39. 1 overs); Alex Davies 20 (53); Jack Leach 5/28 (12. 1 overs)		192 (46 overs); Lewis Gregory 64* (73); Keshav Maharaj 4/65 (19 overs)
170 (52. 4 overs); Steven Croft 51 (110); Jack Leach 7/74 (26. 5 overs)		77 (26. 4 overs); Dom Bess 19 (36); Keshav Maharaj 7/37 (13. 4 overs)

Match tied
Cooper Associates County Ground, Taunton
Umpires: Jeremy Lloyds and Paul Baldwin

- Lancashire won the toss and elected to bat first

=== Khyber Pakhtunkhwa v Central Punjab 2021 ===
1–5 January 2021
Scorecard

Khyber Pakhtunkhwa	v	Central Punjab
300 (97. 5 overs); Kamran Ghulam 76 (129); Hasan Ali 4/62 (23. 5 overs)		257/9d (83 overs); Qasim Akram 60* (102); Irfanullah Shah 4/73 (20 overs)
312 (93. 5 overs); Kamran Ghulam 108 (208); Waqas Maqsood 4/77 (23. 5 overs)		355 (93. 5 overs); Hasan Ali 106 (61); Sajid Khan 4/86 (26. 3 overs)

Match tied
National Stadium, Karachi
Umpires: Asif Yaqoob and Rashid Riaz
Player of the match: Hasan Ali

- Khyber Pakhtunkhwa won the toss and elected to bat first

=== Gloucestershire v Glamorgan 2024 ===
30 June – 3 July 2024

Gloucestershire	v	Glamorgan
179 (44. 5 overs); Marchant de Lange 46* (37); Timm van der Gugten 5/59 (15 overs)		197 (61. 1 overs); Mason Crane 44 (56); Beau Webster 5/17 (10. 1 overs)
610/5d (116 overs); James Bracey 204* (231); Timm van der Gugten 2/98 (22 overs)		592 (152 overs); Sam Northeast 187 (277); Matt Taylor 3/120 (31 overs)

Match tied
College Ground, Cheltenham
Umpires: Naeem Ashraf and Paul Baldwin

- Glamorgan won the toss and elected to field first
- As the last possible ball of the match was bowled, Glamorgan needed one run for victory with only one wicket left. If they had scored off the delivery, Glamorgan would have achieved the highest successful fourth innings chase in the history of first-class cricket.

== See also ==
- Tied Test
- List of tied One Day Internationals
- List of tied Twenty20 Internationals

== Bibliography ==
- Bowen, Rowland (1970). Cricket: A History of its Growth and Development. London: Eyre & Spottiswoode. ISBN 978-04-13278-60-9.
- Buckley, G. B. (1935). Fresh Light on 18th Century Cricket. Birmingham: Cotterell & Co. OCLC 23450280.
- Haygarth, Arthur (1996) [1862]. Scores & Biographies, Volume 1 (1744–1826). Kennington: Frederick Lillywhite. ISBN 978-19-00592-23-9.
- Maun, Ian (2009). From Commons to Lord's, Volume One: 1700 to 1750. Cambridge: Roger Heavens. ISBN 978-19-00592-52-9.
- Waghorn, H. T. (1899). Cricket Scores, Notes, &c. From 1730–1773. Edinburgh: Blackwood. OCLC 1086375331.
- Waghorn, H. T. (2005) [1906]. The Dawn of Cricket. London: J. W. McKenzie. ISBN 978-09-47821-17-3.
