= 1948 Ashes series =

Test cricket series between England and Australia

- Part of the Australian cricket team in England in 1948
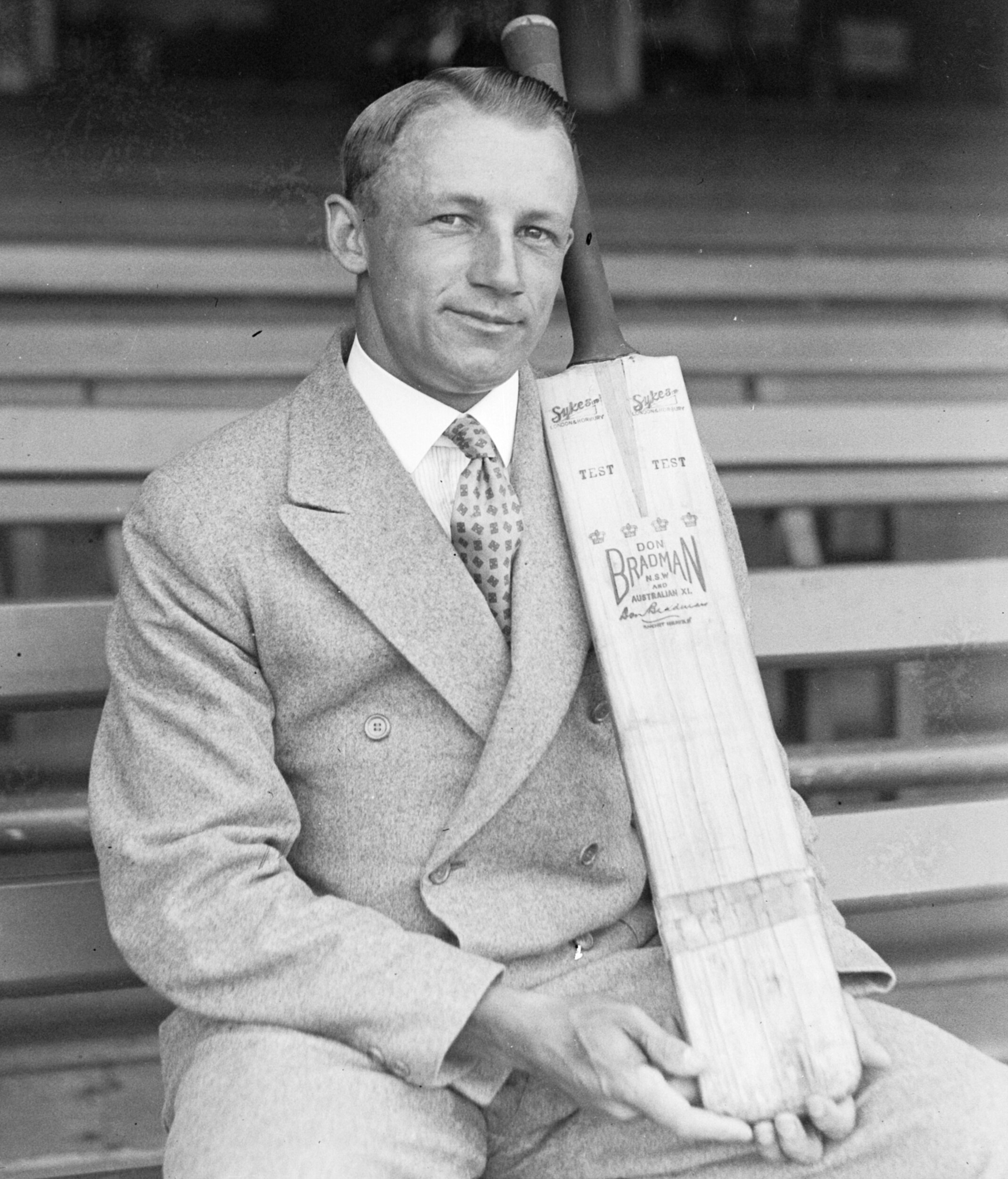
- The Australian captain, Don Bradman
- Date: 10 June – 18 August 1948
- Location: England
- Result: Australia won the five-Test series 4–0
Teams
- England: Australia
Captains
- NWD Yardley: DG Bradman
Most runs
- DCS Compton (562): AR Morris (696); DG Bradman (508)
Most wickets
- AV Bedser (18): RR Lindwall (27); WA Johnston (27)

The 1948 Ashes series was that year's edition of the long-standing cricket rivalry between England and Australia. Starting on 10 June 1948, England and Australia played five Tests. Australia had not lost a Test since the Second World War and were strong favourites. Their captain Don Bradman had publicly expressed his ambition of going through the tour without defeat, and Australia won 10 of their 12 lead-up matches, eight by an innings. The England team, however, had several notable players themselves, including Len Hutton, Denis Compton and Alec Bedser. Nevertheless, the final result was a 4–0 series win for Australia, with the Third Test being drawn. They thus retained The Ashes. The Australians remained undefeated for their entire tour of England, earning them the sobriquet of The Invincibles.

The First Test set the trend for the series as England's batsmen struggled against the Australian pace attack and, despite attempting to stifle the Australian scoring with leg theory, fell to an eventual defeat. Failure to contain the Australian batsmen, particularly Bradman himself, plagued the English bowlers, while their batsmen were prone to struggling and collapsing on key occasions, with rain petering the Third Test into a draw. The series saw a number of notable cricketing feats, including a 301-run partnership between Bradman and Arthur Morris, aided by many dropped catches and missed stumpings, during the Fourth Test, and Australia's heaviest win of the series in the Fifth Test, where England were bowled out for 52 in half a day. Australia then made 389, with Bradman making a famous duck in his final innings. England were then bowled out for 188 to lose by an innings and 149 runs in less than three days' playing time.

== Test representatives ==
England
- Norman Yardley (c)
- Godfrey Evans (wk)
- Len Hutton
- Cyril Washbrook
- Bill Edrich
- Denis Compton
- Joe Hardstaff Jr
- Tom Dollery
- Ken Cranston
- Charlie Barnett
- Jack Crapp
- John Dewes
- Allan Watkins
- Alec Bedser
- Alec Coxon
- Dick Pollard
- Jim Laker
- Jack Young
- Eric Hollies
- Doug Wright
Australia
- Keith Johnson (manager)
- Donald Bradman (captain) (information)
- Lindsay Hassett (vice-captain) (information)
- Ray Lindwall (information)
- Keith Miller (information)
- Sam Loxton (information)
- Neil Harvey (information)
- Bill Brown (information)
- Arthur Morris (information)
- Don Tallon (wicket-keeper) (information)
- Sid Barnes (information)
- Ian Johnson (information)
- Bill Johnston (information)
- Ernie Toshack (information)
- Doug Ring (information)
- Ron Saggers (wicket-keeper) (information)

== Match details ==
=== First Test, 10–15 June ===
10–15 June
Scorecard

England	v	Australia
165 (79 overs); JC Laker 63 (97); WA Johnston 5/36 (25 overs)		509 (216.2 overs); DG Bradman 138 (323); JC Laker 4/138 (55 overs)
441 (183 overs); DCS Compton 184 (478); KR Miller 4/125 (44 overs)		98/2 (28.3 overs); SG Barnes 64* (101); AV Bedser 2/46 (14.3 overs)

Australia won by 8 wickets
Trent Bridge, Nottingham
Umpires: F Chester (Eng) and E Cooke (Eng)

- England won the toss and elected to bat.

Since the Second World War, Australia had played 11 Tests and had been unbeaten. In early 1946, they defeated New Zealand in a one-off Test by an innings. The following season, in 1946–47, they won the five-Test series against England 3–0, and followed this with a 4–0 series win over India in the following season. Australia were regarded as an extremely strong team in the lead-up to the tour of England, and Bradman publicly expressed his desire to achieve the unprecedented feat of going through the five-month tour without defeat. Prior to the First Test, Australia had played 12 first-class matches, winning ten and drawing two. Eight of the victories were by an innings, and another was by eight wickets. One of the drawn matches, against Lancashire was rain-affected with the first day washed out entirely.

It was thought that Bradman would play Ring, but he changed his mind on the first morning of the First Test when rain was forecast. Johnston was played in the hope of exploiting a wet wicket. Yardley won the toss and elected to bat. England lost leg spinner Wright before the match due to lumbago.

The first innings of the First Test set the pattern of the series as the England top-order struggled against Australia's pace attack. Only twenty minutes of play was possible before the lunch break on the first day due to inclement weather, but it was enough for Miller to bowl Hutton with a faster ball. During the interval, heavy rain fell, making the ball skid through upon resumption. Washbrook was out after the luncheon interval, caught on the run by Brown at fine leg after attempting to hook Lindwall. At 15/2, Compton came to the crease, and together with Edrich, they took the score to 46 before left arm paceman Johnston bowled the latter. Two balls later, Johnston removed Hardstaff without scoring, caught by Miller in slips, an effort described by Wisden as "dazzling". Two runs later, Compton was bowled attempting a leg sweep from the bowling of Miller and half the English team were out with only 48 runs on the board. Lindwall was forced to leave the field mid-innings due to a groin injury and did not bowl again in the match. Johnston bowled Barnett for eight and when Evans and Yardley were both dismissed with the score on 74, England was facing the prospect of setting a new record for the lowest Test innings score at Trent Bridge, the current record being 112. Laker and Bedser, both from Surrey, scored more than half of England's total, adding 89 runs in only 73 minutes. Laker's innings was highlighted by hooking, while Bedser defended stoutly and drove in front of the wicket. Bedser was removed by Johnston and Miller had Laker caught behind two runs later, ending England's innings at 165. Laker top-scored with 63 in 101 minutes, with six boundaries. Johnston ended with 5/36, a display characterised with accuracy and variations in pace and swing. Miller took 3/38 and a catch.

Australia had less than 15 minutes of batting before the scheduled close of play. Barnes made an unsuccessful appeal against the light after the first ball of the innings, which was a wide by Edrich. Morris and Barnes successfully negotiated the new ball by Edrich and Bedser to reach stumps with 17 without loss. Ideal batting conditions and clear weather greeted the players on the second day. Barnes and Morris took the score to 73 before Morris was bowled by Laker's off spin. Bradman came in and the score progressed to 121 when Barnes cut Laker onto the thigh of wicket-keeper Evans. The ball bounced away and the gloveman turned around and took a one-handed diving catch to dismiss Barnes for 62. Miller came in and was dismissed for a duck without further addition to Australia's total. He failed to pick Laker's arm ball, which went straight on, clipped the outside edge and was taken at slip by Edrich.

Laker to this point had taken 3/22 from 12.4 overs. All the while, Australia had been scoring slowly, as they would throughout the day. Yardley set a defensive field, employing leg theory to slow the scoring. Brown came in at No. 5, but he had played most of his career as an opening batsman. Yardley took Laker out of the attack and took the second new ball. Bradman struck his first boundary in over 80 minutes but the run rate remained low. Australia passed England's total before Yardley brought himself on to bowl, trapping Brown leg before wicket in his first over. Hassett came in at 185/4 and Australia batted to stumps on the second day without further loss, ending at 293/4, a lead of 128. Bradman reached his 28th Test century in over 210 minutes, with the last 29 runs taking 70 minutes. It was one of his slower innings as Yardley focused on stopping runs rather than taking wickets.

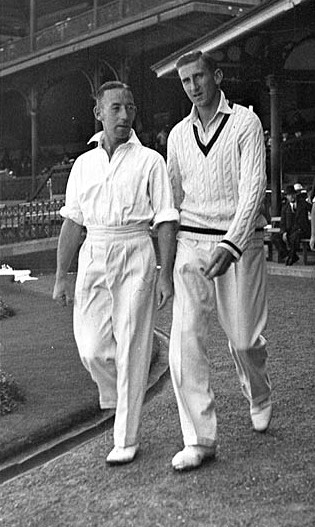
Hassett (pictured left in the late-1930s), scored 137 for Australia.

On the third morning, Bradman resumed on 130, before progressing to 132 and becoming the first player to pass 1,000 runs for the English season. His innings was soon terminated at 138 when he leg glanced an inswinger from Bedser to Hutton at short fine leg. Bradman had batted for 290 minutes and Johnson replaced him with Australia at 305/5. Johnson made 21 before being bowled by Laker, and Tallon took 39 minutes to compile 10 before hitting a return catch to the left arm orthodox spin of Young. The scoring was slow during this passage of play—Young delivered 11 consecutive maiden overs and his 26-over spell conceded only 14 runs. Lindwall came out to bat at 365/7 without a runner and he added 107 runs with Hassett for the eighth wicket. Hassett reached his century and proceeded to 137 in almost six hours of batting, striking 20 fours and a six. The partnership was terminated when Bedser struck Hassett's off stump. Lindwall was caught by Evans down the leg side four runs later, but Australia's last-wicket pair of Johnston and Toshack wagged a further 33 runs in only 18 minutes before Bedser trapped Toshack lbw to end the innings on 509, leaving the tourists with a 344-run lead. Australia had batted for 216.2 overs, the longest innings in terms of overs and the highest total in the series. Yardley placed the majority of the bowling load on his spinners, with Young (1/79) and Laker (4/138) bowling 60 and 55 overs respectively. Bedser bowled 44.2 overs, taking 3/113.

At the start of England's second innings, Miller removed Washbrook for one from a top-edged hook shot. Edrich was then caught behind attempting a cut from the off spin of Johnson, leaving England 39/2. This brought together England's leading batsmen, Hutton and Compton, who took the score to 121 without further loss by stumps on the third day. Miller battled with Hutton and Compton through the afternoon, delivering five bouncers in the last over of the day. One of these struck Hutton high on his left arm. The batsmen survived, but Miller received a hostile reaction from the crowd. Nevertheless, the English had the better of the late afternoon period, scoring 82 runs together in 70 minutes, including one 14-run over bowled by Miller where Hutton struck consecutive boundaries. The third day was followed by a rest day on Sunday and play resumed on the fourth morning, a Monday. The Nottinghamshire County Cricket Club secretary, H. A. Brown, broadcast an appeal to the gallery to refrain from their heckling of Miller on the third day.

Hutton resumed on 63 and he and Compton progressed before the light deteriorated. An unsuccessful appeal against the light was quickly followed by a thunderstorm, which stopped proceedings. Shortly after the resumption, Miller bowled Hutton with an off cutter in the dark conditions, ending a 111-run partnership at 150/3. The innings was then interrupted by poor light and upon the resumption, poor visibility intervened for a second time with Compton on 97. After 55 minutes of delay, the umpires called for the resumption. Wisden opined that "rarely can a Test Match have been played under such appalling conditions as on this day". Hardstaff supported Compton in a partnership of 93 before being removed by Toshack, and Barnett was removed by Johnston for six with the score having progressed a further 17 runs to 264/5. Compton brought up his third consecutive century at Trent Bridge, aided by a 57-run partnership with his captain before Johnston held a return catch to dismiss Yardley for 22. England reached stumps at 345/6, just one run ahead of Australia, with Compton on 154 and Evans on 10.

Compton and Evans continued to resist the Australians on the final morning, which was briefly interrupted twice by rain. Miller bowled a fast bouncer at Compton, who moved into position to hook before changing his mind and attempting to evade the ball. He lost balance and fell onto his wicket. He was out hit wicket for 184. He had batted for 413 minutes and hit 19 fours. Wisden opined that "No praise could be too high for the manner in which Compton carried the side's responsibilities and defied a first-class attack in such trying circumstances". Compton's fall at 405/7 exposed the bowlers and Australia quickly finished off the innings within half an hour. Miller bowled Laker, Evans reached 50 and was caught behind from Johnston, who then castled Young. England finished at 441 after 183 overs, leaving Australia a target of 98. Lindwall's absence meant that the remaining four frontline bowlers had to bowl more than 32 overs each—Johnston bowled 59 and ended with 4/147 while Miller took 4/125 from 44 overs. Australia progressed steadily to 38 before Bedser bowled Morris for nine and then dismissed Bradman for a duck, again caught by Hutton at short fine leg. This left Australia 48/2. However, Hassett joined Barnes and they reached the target without further loss. Barnes ended on 64 with 11 boundaries, being prolific on the square cut. Barnes tied the scores with a boundary, but ran off the field with a souvenir stump believing that the match was over. He returned to the field when he noticed the crowd reaction and Hassett hit the winning run.

=== Second Test, 24–29 June ===
24–29 June
Scorecard

Australia	v	England
350 (129.3 overs); AR Morris 105; AV Bedser 4/100 (43 overs)		215 (102.4 overs); DCS Compton 53; RR Lindwall 5/70 (27.4 overs)
460/7d (130.2 overs); SG Barnes 141; NWD Yardley 2/36 (13 overs)		186 (78.1 overs); C Washbrook 37; HE Dollery 37; ERH Toshack 5/40 (20.1 overs)

Australia won by 409 runs
Lord's, London
Umpires: CN Woolley (Eng) and D Davies (Eng)

- Australia won the toss and elected to bat.
- A Coxon (Eng) made his Test debut.

Australian retained the same XI from the First Test at Trent Bridge. On the other hand, England made three changes; the leg spinner Wright had regained fitness and replaced the left arm orthodox of Young, all rounder Alec Coxon made his Test debut in place of Barnett and Dollery replaced Hardstaff as the No. 5. batsman. Hardstaff had scored a duck and 43 in the First Test, while Barnett managed only eight and six. Following his injury in the previous Test, Lindwall was subjected to a thorough fitness test on the first morning. Bradman was not convinced of Lindwall's fitness, but the bowler's protestations was sufficient to convince his captain to gamble on his inclusion. Australia won the toss and elected to bat, allowing Lindwall further time to recover before bowling. Miller played, but was unfit to bowl.

Coxon opened the bowling with Bedser and removed Barnes for a duck in his second over, caught by Hutton at short fine leg from a short delivery, leaving Australia 3/1. Morris and Bradman rebuilt the innings, taking the score to 87 before Bradman was caught for the third consecutive time by Hutton in the leg trap off Bedser. Hutton had dropped Bradman in the same position when the Australian captain was on 13. In the meantime, Morris, after a slow start, made 105 runs out of a total of 166 scored while he was at the wicket, including 14 fours and one six. His innings was noted for powerful, well-placed cover drives. He was out after hitting Coxon to Hutton in the gully, leaving Australia at 166/3. Miller came in and Bedser bowled three consecutive outswingers to him. A fourth ball swung the other way, with Miller not offering a shot. He was given out leg before wicket for four. Brown came in at 173/4 and helped Hassett to rebuild the innings after the two quick wickets of Morris and Miller. Both scored slowly, taking more than three and half minutes on average for each run. Hassett was dropped three times before Yardley bowled him and then trapped Brown lbw in the space of nine runs to leave Australia 225/6. Edrich had Johnson caught behind for four and England were well placed when Australia ended the day on 258/7.

Australia's lower order batted the tourists into control on the second morning. Despite the loss of Lindwall for 15 at 275/8, Tallon kept on batting, supported by Johnston and Toshack, who scored their highest Test scores. Australia's wicket-keeper put on 45 with Johnston—who scored 29— before becoming Bedser's second victim for the morning. Toshack then joined Johnston and the last pair put on 30 more runs before Johnston was stumped from Wright's leg spin. Yardley was later criticised for not bringing Wright into the attack at an earlier stage, as the Australian tail were dealing well with the English pacemen. Bedser was the most successful of the bowlers, ending with 4/100 from 43 overs, while Coxon took 2/90 from 35 overs.

Lindwall took the new ball and felt pain in his groin again after delivering his first ball to Hutton. Despite this, Lindwall persevered through the pain. He had Washbrook caught behind for eight in his fourth over. Hutton then played outside a Johnson off break and was bowled for 20 to leave England at 32/2. Lindwall then clean bowled Edrich before doing the same to Dollery for a duck two balls later. England were 46/4 and Australia were firmly in control. Compton was joined by his skipper Yardley and the pair rebuilt the innings, scoring 87 runs together in 100 minutes. After the tea break, Lindwall and Johnston returned with the new ball. Compton edged Johnston into the slips, where Miller took a low catch, dismissing him for 53. One run later, Lindwall clipped Yardley's off stump with the first ball of the over to leave England at 134/6 with their skipper dismissed for 44. Johnson then removed Evans for nine, before Coxon and Laker put on a 41-run stand for the eight wicket. After 85 minutes of resistance, Coxon hit a catch back to Johnson and Laker was caught behind from the same bowler, having already been dropped twice. England's last pair added ten runs to close at stumps on 9/207.

On the third morning, Bedser inside-edged a Lindwall bouncer onto his stumps, ending England's innings at 215, giving Australia a 135 first innings lead. Lindwall ended with 5/70. In later years, Bradman told Lindwall that he pretended not to notice Lindwall's pain. Lindwall was worried that Bradman had noticed his injury, but Bradman later claimed that he feigned ignorance to allow Lindwall to relax. The weather was fine as Australia started their second innings. Barnes survived a missed stumping opportunity when he was 18 and he took advantage to combine with Morris in an opening stand of 122. Morris was then bowled for 62, knocking a ball from Wright onto his stumps. Bradman joined Barnes at the crease and they amassed 174 runs for the second wicket. Barnes started slowly, but he accelerated after reaching his half-century. Once he reached his century, Barnes became particularly aggressive. He dispatched one Laker over for 21 runs, included two successive blows over the boundary for six. He was finally removed for 141, caught on the boundary from Yardley. He had struck 14 boundaries and two sixes in his innings. The speed of his batting had allowed Australia to be 296/2 after 277 minutes when he departed. Hassett was bowled first ball, so Miller came to the crease at 296/3 to face Yardley's hat-trick ball. Miller survived a loud leg before wicket appeal on the hat-trick ball. Bradman was on 89 and heading towards a century in his last Test innings at Lord's when he fell to Bedser again, this time because of a one-handed diving effort from Edrich at slip. Brown joined Miller at 329/4 and Australia reached stumps at 343, without further loss, with Miller having struck one six into the grandstand.

After the rest day, Australia resumed with a lead of 478 runs with six wickets in hand. The morning was punctuated by three rain stoppages. In 88 minutes of play, Australia added a further 117 runs. Brown was caught behind from Coxon for 32 after an 87-run partnership with Miller, bringing Lindwall to the crease. Miller's innings was noted for its driving and when he was out for 74, followed by Lindwall for 25, Bradman declared with Australia at 460/7, 595 runs ahead. It would take a world record chase from England to win the match. Yardley and Laker had been the only multiple wicket-takers, with two each.

Further showers breathed extra life into the pitch, and Lindwall and Johnston extracted steep bounce with the new ball, troubling the English batsmen. Miller dropped Hutton from Lindwall's bowling before he had scored and played and missed multiple times. Hutton and Washbrook took the score to 42, England's highest opening partnership of the series thus far, before Hutton edged Lindwall to Johnson and was out for 13. Edrich and Washbrook were then subjected to repeated short balls, before Toshack removed both in quick succession to leave England at 65/3. However, Compton and Dollery added 41 in the last 30 minutes to have England close at 106/3.

The final day started poorly for England, with Compton edging Johnston to a diving Miller at second slip from the second ball of the day. England had lost a wicket without adding to their overnight total. Yardley and Dollery took the score to 133 before Toshack bowled the former. He then trapped Coxon lbw two balls later in the same over. Eight runs later, Dollery shaped to duck a Lindwall bouncer, but it skidded through low and bowled him. Lindwall bowled Laker for a duck later in the same over to leave England at 141/8. Evans continued to resist stubbornly, remaining 24 not out as England were bowled out for 186 to cede a 409-run victory. Toshack ended the innings with 5/40, while Lindwall and Johnston took three and two respectively. The gross attendance was 132,000 and receipts were £43,000 – a record for a Test in England.

=== Third Test, 8–13 July ===
8–13 July
Scorecard

England	v	Australia
363 (171.5 overs); DCS Compton 145*; RR Lindwall 4/99 (40 overs)		221 (93 overs); AR Morris 51; AV Bedser 4/81 (36 overs)
174/3d (69 overs); C Washbrook 85*; ERH Toshack 1/26 (12 overs)		92/1 (61 overs); AR Morris 54*; JA Young 1/31 (21 overs)

Match drawn
Old Trafford, Manchester
Umpires: D Davies (Eng) and F Chester (Eng)

- England won the toss and elected to bat.
- George Emmett and Jack Crapp (both Eng) made their Test debuts.

When the teams reconvened at Old Trafford for the Third Test, Hutton had been dropped. The reason was said to be Hutton's struggles with Lindwall's short-pitched bowling. The omission generated considerable controversy. The Australians were pleased, feeling that Hutton was England's best batsman. Hutton's opening position was taken by debutant George Emmett. England made three further changes. Young and Pollard replaced Wright and Laker in the bowling department, thereby reverting from two spinners to one. Coxon, who made his debut in the previous match and opened the bowling, took match figures of 3/172 and scored 19 and a duck, was replaced by another debutant in batsman Jack Crapp. Australia dropped Brown, who had scored 73 runs at 24.33 in three innings, with the all rounder Loxton. Yardley won the toss and elected to bat.

The change in England's opening pair did not result in an improvement on the scoreboard. A run out was narrowly avoided from the first ball, and Washbrook and Emmett appeared to be uncomfortable on a surface that offered early assistance to the bowlers. With 22 runs on the board, Johnston bowled Washbrook with a yorker, and six runs later, Emmett fended a rising ball from Lindwall to Barnes at short leg, leaving England 28/2. Edrich eschewed attacking strokeplay as he and Compton attempted to establish themselves. Lindwall bowled a series of short balls. One hit Compton on the arm and the batsman attempted to hook another bouncer, but edged it into his face. This forced Compton to leave the field with a bloodied eyebrow with the score at 33/2. Edrich and Crapp then engaged in grim defensive batting, resulting in one 25-minute period where only one run was added. They reached lunch at 57/2. Upon the resumption, Crapp began to accelerate, hitting a six and three boundaries from Johnson. Australia took the new ball and Lindwall trapped Crapp lbw for 37. Dollery took a single to get off the mark but then missed a yorker from Johnston and was bowled. England had lost two wickets for one run to be 97/4. After 170 minutes of slow batting, Edrich gloved a rising Lindwall delivery and was caught behind. At 119/5, Compton returned to the field, his wound having been stitched to stop the bleeding. Yardley fell to Toshack for 22 with the score at 141/6, bringing Evans to the crease. Compton combined with the gloveman to add 75 runs for the seventh wicket in 70 minutes, before Lindwall removed Evans to leave England 216/7.

England resumed on the second day at 231/7 and Australia was unable to break through with the new ball. Bedser stubbornly defied the Australians for 145 minutes, adding 37 and featuring in a 121-run partnership with Compton before he was run out. Soon after, Pollard pulled a ball from Johnson into the ribs of Barnes, who was standing at short leg. Barnes had to be carried from the ground by four policemen and taken to hospital for an examination. Toshack then bowled Pollard and Young was caught from Johnston's bowling as England were bowled out for 363. Compton was unbeaten on 145 in 324 minutes of batting, having struck 16 fours. Lindwall took 4/99 and Johnston 3/67. Miller did not bowl and the remaining four frontline bowlers sent down at least 38 overs each.

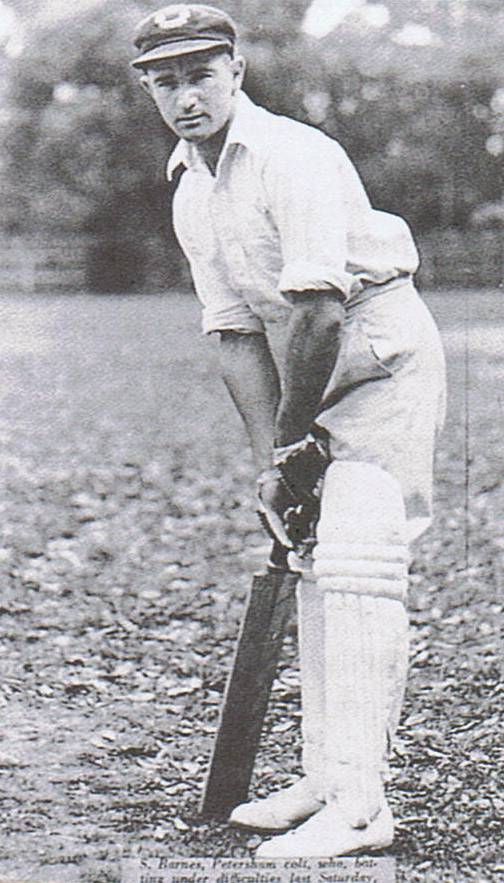
Barnes was taken to hospital after being hit in the ribs.

Having dropped Brown, Barnes's injury left Australia with only Morris as a specialist opener. Johnson was deployed as Australia's makeshift second opener. He was unable to make an impact, as Bedser removed him for one, and Pollard then trapped Bradman for seven to leave Australia at 13/2. Morris and Hassett rebuilt the innings, adding 69 for the third wicket in 101 minutes before Hassett was beaten in flight by Young and was caught by Washbrook. Miller joined Morris and they took the score to 126/3 at stumps.

Australia had added only nine runs on the third morning when Pollard trapped Miller for 31 with the new ball. Four runs later, Morris had reached 51 when Bedser removed him, leaving Australia 139/5. Barnes came out to bat at 135/4, despite having collapsed while practising in the nets due to the aftereffects of the blow to his chest. He made a painful single in 25 minutes of batting before it became too much and he had to be taken from the ground and sent to the hospital to be put under observation. Tallon and Loxton added a further 43 before Tallon was caught behind from Edrich. Lindwall came into bat at 172/6 with Australia facing the prospect of the follow on. He then received five consecutive bouncers from Edrich, one of which hit him in the hand, evoking cheers from the home crowd. Loxton and Lindwall added a further 36 before the former was bowled by Pollard, leaving Australia 208/7, five runs behind the follow-on mark. Johnston helped Lindwall advance Australia beyond the follow on before Bedser removed both and Australia were bowled out for 221, giving England a lead of 142 runs. Bedser and Pollard were the most successful bowlers, taking 4/81 and 3/53 respectively.

Lindwall removed Emmett for a duck at the start of the second innings, bringing his tormentor Edrich to the crease. Bradman advised Lindwall not to bowl any bouncers at Edrich, fearing that it would be interpreted as retaliation and lead to a negative media and crowd reaction. However, Miller did retaliate with a series of bouncers, earning the ire of the crowd. He struck Edrich on the body before Bradman intervened and order him to stop. Edrich and Washbrook settled and put together a 124-run partnership in only 138 minutes. This was aided by the Australian fielders, who twice dropped Washbrook at long leg and once in the slips cordon. Edrich struck eight boundaries and brought up his fifty with a six, but was immediately run out by Morris, who threw down the stumps from cover. Toshack removed Compton for a duck, leaving England at 125/3. Crapp joined Washbrook and helped see off the new ball, as England reached 174 at the close without further loss, with Washbrook unbeaten on 85.

The rest day was followed by the fourth day, which was abandoned due to persistent rain. Yardley declared at the start of the fifth day, leaving Australia a victory target of 317, but the rain kept falling and the entire first session was lost. Young removed Johnson for six to leave Australia 10/1, but the tourists thereafter batted safely in a defensive manner to ensure a draw. They ended at 92/1 in 61 overs, a run rate of 1.50, which was the slowest innings run rate to date in the series. Morris finished unbeaten on 54, his fourth consecutive half-century of the Test series. The attendance of 133,740 exceeded the previous Test.

=== Fourth Test, 22–27 July ===
22–27 July
Scorecard

England	v	Australia
496 (192.1 overs); C Washbrook 143; SJ Loxton 3/55 (26 overs)		458 (136.2 overs); RN Harvey 112; AV Bedser 3/92 (31.2 overs)
365/8d (107 overs); DCS Compton 66; WA Johnston 4/95 (29 overs)		404/3 (114.1 overs); AR Morris 182; K Cranston 1/28 (7.1 overs)

Australia won by 7 wickets
Headingley, Leeds
Umpires: F Chester (Eng) and HG Baldwin (Eng)

- England won the toss and elected to bat.
- Ron Saggers (Aus) made his Test debut.

Australia made two changes for the Test; Neil Harvey replaced the injured Barnes, while Ron Saggers made his Test debut replacing Tallon behind the stumps. Tallon's little left finger had swelled up after the Third Test and he exacerbated the injury during a tour match against Middlesex. England made three changes. Emmett was dropped after making 10 and a duck on debut and Hutton was recalled to take his opening position. Laker, the off spinner, replaced his left arm finger spinning colleague Young. Dollery, who had made only 38 in three innings, was replaced by all-rounder Cranston.

England won the toss and elected to bat on an ideal batting pitch. Hutton and Washbrook put on an opening partnership of 168, the best by England in the series. Washbrook refrained from the hook shot, which had caused him to lose his wicket on earlier occasions in the series. The partnership was ended when Hutton was bowled by Lindwall. Washbrook reached his century with the score on 189. Joined by Edrich, the pair batted until late in the first day, when Washbrook was dismissed by Johnston for 143 in the last over of the day. His innings had included 22 boundaries and ended a second wicket partnership that yielded exactly 100 runs. Bedser was sent in as the nightwatchman and survived the last four balls as England closed without further addition to score at 268/2, with Edrich on 41.

The next day, Bedser batted on in steady support of Edrich. The pair saw England to lunch without further loss, and 155 runs were added for the third wicket before Bedser was out in the second session after almost three hours of batting. Bedser had struck eight fours and two sixes in a Test career best 79 before returning a catch to the off spin of Johnson. Edrich fell to Johnson after three further runs were added with the score at 426/4. He had batted for 314 minutes in compiling 111, with 13 fours and a six. With two new batsmen at the crease, Australia quickly made further inroads. Toshack bowled Crapp for five and after Compton and Yardley added 26 for the sixth wicket, the former edged Lindwall and Saggers had his first Test catch to leave England at 473/6. Playing in his first Test of the summer, Loxton then successively removed Cranston, Evans and Laker as England fell from 486/6 to 496/9. Miller then bowled the English skipper Yardley to end England's innings at 496. The home side had batted for 192.1 overs and lost their last eight wickets for the addition of 73 runs. Loxton took 3/55 while Lindwall and Johnson both took two. Australia lost the services of Toshack after he broke down with a knee injury. With Barnes injured, Hassett was moved from the middle order to open the innings with Morris. Bedser removed Morris for six with the new ball, to leave Australia at 13/1, before Bradman and Hassett saw the tourists to stumps at 63/1. Bradman did the majority of the scoring in the late afternoon, finishing unbeaten on 31 in a partnership of 40.

On the third morning, England made the ideal start when Pollard removed both of the established batsmen in his opening over. He removed Hassett for 13 and two balls later bowled Bradman for 33. This left Australia struggling at 68/3. Harvey, playing his first Ashes Test, joined Miller at the crease. Australia were more than 400 behind and Harvey told his senior partner "Let's get stuck into 'em". If England were to remove the pair, they would expose Australia's lower order and give themselves an opportunity to win by taking substantial lead. The pair launched a counterattack, with Miller taking the lead. He hoisted Laker's first ball over square leg for six. Miller shielded Harvey from Laker, as he was struggling against the off breaks that were turning away from him. Miller struck consecutive sixes over long off and the sightscreen respectively. This allowed Australia to seize the initiative, with Harvey joining in and hitting consecutive boundaries against Laker. Miller then lifted another six over long off, hitting a spectator in the head, and another over long on from Yardley's bowling. He was dismissed by Yardley for 58 attempting another six, when an edge bounced off Evans' head and was caught by a diving Edrich at short fine leg.

The partnership had yielded 121 runs in 90 minutes, likened by Wisden to a "hurricane". Harvey then shared another century stand with Loxton which yielded 105 in only 95 minutes. Harvey ended with a century on his Ashes debut, scoring 112 from 183 balls in an innings noted for powerful driving on both sides of the wicket. The innings and the high rate of scoring helped to swing the match back from England's firm control. Loxton was particularly severe on Laker, lifting him into the crowd for five sixes in addition to nine fours. Harvey fell at 294/5 and Johnson scored 10 before falling with the score at 329/6, both dismissed by Laker.

Australia was still some way behind when Lindwall replaced Johnson. Fifteen runs later, Yardley bowled Loxton for 93, while Saggers only managed five in his first Test innings before being stumped after being lured out of his crease by Laker. This left Australia at 355/8 with only Johnston and Toshack remaining. Lindwall hit out, scoring 77, an innings marked by powerful driving and pulling, dominating in stands of 48 and 55 with Johnston and Toshack respectively. Of the 103 added for the last two wickets, Johnston and Toshack managed only 25 between them. Lindwall was the last man out at 458, leaving Australia 38 runs in arrears on the first innings. Australia added only one run to its overnight score of 457/9, with Bedser taking the final wicket to end with 3/92. Laker took 3/113, while Pollard and Yardley ended with two wickets each.

England set about extending their first innings lead for the remainder of the fourth day. For the second time in the match, Washbrook and Hutton put on a century opening partnership. Johnston removed Washbrook for 65 before Johnson removed Hutton for 57 without further addition to the total, leaving England at 129/2. Edrich and Compton continued where the openers had left off, adding 103 for the third wicket before Lindwall trapped Edrich for 54. Crapp came in and added 18 before Lindwall bowled him at 260/4 and precipitated a mini-collapse. Yardley made seven before Johnston removed him. Johnston then removed Cranston caught behind for a duck with only a further run added to leave England at 278/6. When Johnston removed Compton for 66, caught by Miller, England were 7/293 with no recognised batsmen remaining. They had lost 4/33. Wicket-keeper Evans was joined by Bedser, and the pair added 37 before Miller removed the latter. Laker then helped Evans to add a further 32 as England reached 362/8 at the close of the fourth day.

England batted on for five minutes on the final morning, adding three runs in two overs before Yardley declared at 365/8, with Evans on 47 not out. Johnston had the pick of the bowling figures, with 4/95. Batting into the final day allowed Yardley to ask the groundsman to use a heavy roller, which would help to break up the wicket and make the surface more likely to spin.

This left Australia a target of 404 runs for victory. At the time, this would have been the highest ever fourth innings score to result in a Test victory for the batting side. Australia had only 345 minutes to reach the target, and the local press wrote them off, predicting that they would be dismissed by lunchtime on a deteriorating wicket expected to favor the spin bowlers. Morris and Hassett started slowly, with only six runs in the first six overs on a pitch that offered spin and bounce. When Laker was introduced to exploit the spin, 13 runs were taken from his first over, but only 44 runs came in the first hour, leaving 360 runs needed in 285 minutes. Just 13 runs were added in the next 28 minutes before Hassett was dismissed by Compton's left arm unorthodox spin for 17 with the score at 57. Bradman joined Morris with 347 runs needed in 257 minutes. Bradman signalled his intentions on his first ball by driving Laker against the spin for a boundary. Morris promptly joined Bradman in the counter-attack, hitting three consecutive fours off Len Hutton's bowling as Australia reached lunch at 121/1. In the half-hour preceding the interval, Australia had added 64 runs. Australia had given chances, but England failed to seize them. Evans failed to stump Morris when he was on 32, and Crapp dropped Bradman from Compton.

Upon resumption, Morris severely attacked Compton, who had been bowling in an attempt to exploit the spin, aided by a series of full tosses and long hops that were easily dispatched for runs. This prompted Yardley to take the new ball and replace Compton with pacemen. Australia reached 202, halfway to the required total, with 165 minutes left. When Bradman suffered a fibrositis attack, Morris had to shield him from the strike until it subsided. Morris passed his century, and was then given another life on 126 when Laker dropped him while fielding at square leg. Bradman was given another life at 108 when Evans missed a stumping opportunity. Australia reached tea at 288/1 with Morris on 150. The pair had added 167 during the session. Morris was eventually dismissed by Yardley for 182, having partnered Bradman in a stand of 301 in 217 minutes. He struck 33 fours in 290 minutes of batting. This brought Miller to the crease with 46 runs still required. He struck two boundaries and helped take the score to 396 before falling to Cranston with eight runs still needed. Harvey came in and got off the mark with a boundary that brought up the winning runs. Australia had won by seven wickets, setting a new world record for the highest successful Test run-chase, with Bradman unbeaten on 173 in only 255 minutes with 29 fours. The attendance of 158,000 was the highest for any cricket match on English soil and the takings were 34,000 pounds. The attendance remains a record for a Test in England.

=== Fifth Test, 14–18 August ===
14–18 August
Scorecard

England	v	Australia
52 (42.1 overs); L Hutton 30 (124); RR Lindwall 6/20 (16.1 overs)		389 (158.2 overs); AR Morris 196; WE Hollies 5/131 (56 overs)
188 (105.3 overs); L Hutton 64; WA Johnston 4/40 (27.3 overs)

Australia won by an innings and 149 runs
The Oval, London
Umpires: D Davies (Eng) and HG Baldwin (Eng)

- England won the toss and elected to bat.
- Allan Watkins and John Dewes (both Eng) made their Test debuts.

With the series already lost, England made four changes to their team. John Dewes replaced Washbrook, who was suffering from a thumb injury, at the top of the order. Allan Watkins replaced Cranston as the middle order batsman and bowler. Both Dewes and Watkins were making their Test debuts. England played two spinners; Young replaced fellow finger spinner Laker, while the leg spin of Hollies replaced Pollard. The selectors were widely condemned for their changes. Australia made three changes. Having taken only seven wickets in the first four Tests at an average of 61.00, off spinner Johnson was replaced by the leg spin of Ring. Australia's second change was forced on them; the injured Toshack was replaced by the recovered Barnes, meaning that Australia were playing with one extra batsman and one less frontline bowler. The final change was the return of wicket-keeper Tallon from injury.

The match saw Lindwall at his best. English skipper Yardley won the toss and elected to bat on a rain-affected pitch. Precipitation in the week leading up to the match meant that the Test could not start until midday had passed. The damp conditions meant that sawdust had to be added in large amounts to allow the players to keep their grip. The humid conditions, along with the rain, assisted the bowlers, with Lindwall in particular managing to make the ball bounce at variable heights.

Miller bowled Dewes for one with his second ball to leave England at 2/1, before Johnston removed Edrich for three to leave England at 10/2. Lindwall dismissed Compton after Morris had taken a diving catch, and Miller then removed Crapp without scoring after a 23-ball innings, leaving England at 23/4.

After the lunch break, England had struggled to 35/4, before Lindwall bowled Yardley with a swinging yorker. Watkins then batted for 16 balls without scoring before Johnston trapped him for a duck to leave England at 42/6. For his troubles, Watkins also collected a bruise on the shoulder that inhibited his bowling later in the match. Lindwall then removed Evans, Bedser and Young, all yorked in the space of two runs. The innings ended at 52 when Hutton leg glanced and was caught by wicket-keeper Tallon, who grasped the ball one-handed at full stretch to his left. Lindwall described the catch as one of the best he had ever seen. In his post-lunch spell, Lindwall bowled 8.1 overs, taking five wickets for eight runs, finishing with 6/20 in 16.1 overs. Bradman described the spell as "the most devastating and one of the fastest I ever saw in Test cricket". Hutton was the only batsman to resist, scoring 30 in 124 minutes and surviving 147 deliveries. The next most resilient display was from Yardley, who scored seven runs in 31 minutes of resistance, facing 33 balls. Miller and Johnston took 2/5 and 2/20 respectively, and Australia's pace trio removed all the batsmen without Bradman having to call on Ring for a bowl.

In contrast, Australia batted with apparent ease, and Morris and Barnes passed England's first innings total by themselves. The score had reached 117 before Barnes was caught behind from Hollies for 61. The opening stand had been compiled in only 126 minutes. This brought Bradman to the crease shortly before 6 pm late on the first day. As Bradman had announced that the tour was his last at international level, the innings would be his last at Test level if Australia batted only once. The crowd gave him a standing ovation as he walked out to bat. Yardley led the Englishmen in giving his Australian counterpart three cheers. With 6996 Test career runs, he only needed four runs to average 100 in Test cricket, but Hollies bowled him second ball for a duck with a googly that went between bat and pad. Hassett came in at 117/2 and together with Morris saw Australia to the close at 153/2. Morris was unbeaten on 77, having hit two hook shots from Hollies for four.

On the second morning, Hassett and Morris took the score to 226 before their 109-run stand was broken when Young trapped Hassett for 37 after 134 minutes of batting. The following batsmen were unable to establish themselves at the crease. Miller made five and Harvey 17, both falling to Hollies as Australia progressed to 265/5. Loxton accompanied Morris for 39 further runs before Edrich removed him for 15. Young removed Lindwall for nine before Morris was finally removed for 196, ending an innings noted for his hooking and off-driving. It took a run out to remove Morris; he had attempted a quick run after the ball was hit to third man but was not agile enough for the substitute fielder's arm. Tallon, who scored 31, put on another 30 runs with Ring, before both were out on 389, ending Australia's innings. Morris had scored more than half the runs as the rest of the team struggled against the leg spin of Hollies, who took 5/131. England had relied heavily on spin; Young took 2/118 and of the 158.2 overs bowled, 107 were delivered by the two spinners.

England started their second innings 337 runs in arrears. Lindwall made the early breakthrough, bowling Crapp for 10 to leave England 20/1. Edrich joined Hutton and the pair consolidated the innings to close at the end of the second day on 54/1 due to bad light.

Early on the third day, Lindwall bowled Edrich for 28 with the score at 64, before Compton and Hutton consolidated the innings with a partnership of 61 in 110 minutes. On 39, Compton aimed a hard cut shot from Johnston's bowling, which flew into Lindwall's left hand at second slip. Hutton managed to continue resisting the Australians before Miller struck Crapp in the head with a bouncer. Hutton then edged Miller to Tallon and was out for 64, having top-scored in both innings. He had batted for over four hours and left England at 153/4. Thereafter, England collapsed. Crapp was bowled by Miller for nine, and two runs later, Ring dismissed Watkins for two to take his only wicket. Lindwall returned and bowled Evans for eight. Evans appeared to not detect Lindwall's yorker in the fading light, and the umpires called off play due to bad light. The ground was then hit by rain, resulting in a premature end to the day's play. England had lost four wickets for 25 runs to end at 178/7.

England resumed on the fourth morning with only three wickets in hand and still 159 runs in arrears. Johnston quickly removed the last three wickets to seal an Australian victory by an innings and 149 runs. Only ten runs were added, with Hollies being removed for a golden duck, skying a ball to Morris, immediately after Yardley was the ninth man to fall. Johnston ended with 4/40 from 27.3 overs while Lindwall took 3/50 from 25 overs. This result sealed the series 4–0 in favour of Australia. The match was followed by a series of congratulatory speeches.

== Records and statistical analysis ==
As Australia won the series convincingly 4–0, it is not surprising that their players dominated the statistical rankings. Australian batsmen scored eight centuries to four by their English counterparts and scored their runs at a much higher average. Six of the nine highest averaging batsmen were Australian. On the bowling front, Australia's pace attack had far more success and they were a large part of the success. Lindwall and Johnston both took 27 wickets, supported by Miller and Toshack, who took 13 and 11 respectively. For England, only Bedser with 18 was able to take 10 or more wickets, and at a substantially higher cost than the Australian pacemen. The bowling was dominated by pace bowling, with Laker being the only spinner on the list, with by far the worst average. This was in large part because England agreed to make a new ball available every 55 overs, more frequently than under normal conditions. As a new ball is more conducive to fast bowling, this favoured fast bowlers and therefore the team with the best pace attack, in this case Australia.

=== Most runs ===
Player	Team	Matches	Innings	Runs	Average	Highest score	100s	50s
Arthur Morris	Australia	5	9	696	87.00	196	3	3
Denis Compton	England	5	10	562	62.44	184	2	2
Donald Bradman	Australia	5	9	508	72.57	173*	2	1
Cyril Washbrook	England	4	8	356	50.85	143	1	2
Len Hutton	England	4	8	342	42.75	81	0	4
Sid Barnes	Australia	4	6	329	82.25	141	1	3
Bill Edrich	England	5	10	342	31.90	111	1	2
Lindsay Hassett	Australia	5	8	310	44.28	137	1	0

=== Best batting averages ===
Minimum 100 runs and three innings

Player	Team	Matches	Innings	Runs	Average	Highest score	100s	50s
Arthur Morris	Australia	5	9	696	87.00	196	3	3
Sid Barnes	Australia	4	6	329	82.25	141	1	3
Donald Bradman	Australia	5	9	508	72.57	173*	2	1
Neil Harvey	Australia	2	3	133	66.50	112	1	0
Denis Compton	England	5	10	562	62.44	184	2	2
Cyril Washbrook	England	4	8	356	50.85	143	1	2
Sam Loxton	Australia	3	3	144	48.00	93	0	1
Lindsay Hassett	Australia	5	8	310	44.28	137	1	0
Len Hutton	England	4	8	342	42.75	81	0	4

==== Most wickets ====
Player	Team	Matches	Wickets	Average	Best bowling
Ray Lindwall	Australia	5	27	19.62	6/20
Bill Johnston	Australia	5	27	23.33	5/36
Alec Bedser	England	5	18	38.22	4/81
Keith Miller	Australia	5	13	23.15	4/125
Ernie Toshack	Australia	4	11	33.09	5/40
Norman Yardley	England	5	9	22.66	2/32
Jim Laker	England	3	9	52.44	4/138

==== Best bowling averages ====
Minimum nine wickets

Player	Team	Matches	Wickets	Average	Best bowling
Ray Lindwall	Australia	5	27	19.62	6/20
Norman Yardley	England	5	9	22.66	2/32
Keith Miller	Australia	5	13	23.15	4/125
Bill Johnston	Australia	5	27	23.33	5/36
Ernie Toshack	Australia	4	11	33.09	5/40
Alec Bedser	England	5	18	38.22	4/81
Jim Laker	England	3	9	52.44	4/138
