= Claud Woolley =

English cricket player

Claude Woolley

Personal information
- Full name: Claude Neville Woolley
- Born: 5 May 1886; Tonbridge, Kent, England
- Died: 3 November 1962 (aged 76); Abington, Northampton, England
- Nickname: Dick
- Batting: Right-handed
- Bowling: Right-arm slow-medium
- Role: Batsman
- Relatives: Frank Woolley (brother)

Domestic team information
- Years: Team
- 1909: Gloucestershire
- 1911–1931: Northamptonshire
- FC debut: 16 August 1909 Gloucestershire v Australians
- Last FC: 29 July 1931 Northamptonshire v Essex

Umpiring information
- Tests umpired: 1 (1948)

Career statistics
Competition	First-class
Matches	365
Runs scored	15,395
Batting average	24.63
100s/50s	13/78
Top score	204*
Balls bowled	27,260
Wickets	352
Bowling average	33.10
5 wickets in innings	12
10 wickets in match	1
Best bowling	6/30
Catches/stumpings	138/–
- Source: CricketArchive, 1 February 2009

Claud Neville Woolley (5 May 1886 – 3 November 1962) was an English cricketer who played first-class cricket for Gloucestershire and Northamptonshire. He also served as a first-class umpire and stood in one Test during the 1948 Ashes series. A right-handed batsman and right-arm slow-medium bowler, he was the older brother of Frank who had a more successful playing career, including representing England in 64 Tests.

Born in Tonbridge, Woolley began his cricket career with Kent however he failed to break into the first team, making 18 second XI appearances between 1906 and 1908. He joined Gloucestershire but once again failed to establish himself. He made just one first-class appearance in two seasons with the club, in 1909 against the touring Australians. He opened the bowling in the match but took no wickets in eight overs, and batted at number seven, scoring 22. In 1911, Woolley joined Northamptonshire, making his debut for the club against the Indian tourists. He scored just 1 not out batting at number 10 but did take his maiden first-class wicket, dismissing Mukundrao Pai.

That was Woolley's only appearance in his first season with the club but the following season he was given more opportunities playing ten first-class matches. However, he had little success averaging just 10.54 with the bat and taking three wickets. His batting and bowling aggregates improved over the next two seasons, with 670 runs and 15 wickets in 1913 followed by 802 and 28 in 1914. He also scored a maiden century in 1914 against Somerset, and a week later achieved his maiden five-for taking 6 wickets for 31 runs (6/31).

Following World War I Woolley was a regular in the side until 1931, mostly appearing as an opening batsman he passed 1,000 runs in a season on seven occasions between 1921 and 1929. His most productive season came in 1928 when he scored 1,602. His second first-class century came in 1921 and proved to be the highest score of his career and only double century. The innings of 204 not out came against Worcestershire at Northampton. His best bowling of his career also occurred in 1921, against Glamorgan at Cardiff Arms Park, he took 6/30 in the first innings and followed that with 4/22 as the home side followed on. The match figures of 10/52 were the only occasion he took ten wickets in a match.

Woolley's best bowling seasons came directly after the war; he passed 40 wickets in each of the four years between 1919 and 1922 and on nine occasions took five wickets in an innings. Against Essex in 1920 he took a hat-trick, dismissing Charlie McGahey, John Freeman and Percy Perrin.

Woolley played 362 matches for Northamptonshire, placing him eighth on the county's most appearances list. He is also the tenth-highest scorer for the club with 15,353 runs. He carried his bat on three occasions.

After retiring as a player, Woolley began his umpiring career, standing in 281 matches between 1932 and 1953. He umpired one Test match, the second Test of the 1948 Ashes series. During a match between Warwickshire and Nottinghamshire in 1946, Woolley was temporarily required to officiate from both ends as fellow umpire George Beet was taken ill on the way to the game. After Woolley's umpiring career ended, he worked as groundsman at Northampton until his death aged 76.
