= Kriek (disambiguation) =

Kriek lambic is a cherry-infused lambic beer.

Kriek may also refer to:

== People ==
- Emile Kriek (born 1989), South African cricketer
- Erik Kriek (born 1966), Dutch artist
- Johan Kriek (born 1958), South African-American tennis player
- Marjolein Kriek (born 1973), Dutch clinical geneticist
