= Brockwell =

Brockwell may refer to:

== Places ==
- Brockwell, Arkansas, an unincorporated community in Newburg Township, Izard County, Arkansas, United States
- Brockwell, Somerset, a hamlet in Wootton Courtenay parish, England
- Brockwell Park, a park in south London, England

== People ==
- Bill Brockwell (1865–1935), English cricketer
- George Brockwell (1809–1876), English cricketer
- Gladys Brockwell (1894–1929), American actress
- Sam Brockwell (1871–1945), Australian rules footballer
- Sherwood Battle Brockwell (1885–1953), American fire marshal
- Simon Brockwell, Australian rugby league footballer
- Stephen Brockwell, Canadian poet
