= Daniel Day =

Daniel Day may refer to:

- Daniel Day (manufacturer) (1767–1848), American pioneer in woollen manufacturing
- Daniel Day (cricketer) (1807–1887), English cricketer
- Dapper Dan (designer) (born 1944), American fashion designer, born Daniel Day

== See also ==
- Daniel Day-Lewis (born 1957), English actor
- Daniel Dae Kim (born 1968), American actor
