= Richard de Uphaugh =

English cricketer, barrister

Personal information
- Full name: Richard George Duppa de Uphaugh
- Born: 12 March 1895; Camberwell, Surrey, England
- Died: 25 October 1972 (aged 77); Hollingbourne, Kent, England
- Batting: Unknown

Domestic team information
- Years: Team
- 1919: Oxford University

Career statistics
Competition	First-class
Matches	1
Runs scored	47
Batting average	47.00
100s/50s	–/–
Top score	43*
Catches/stumpings	–/–
- Source: Cricinfo, 31 May 2020

Richard George Duppa de Uphaugh (12 March 1895 – 25 October 1972) was an English first-class cricketer.

The son of Richard Duppa de Uphaugh senior and Ethel Ricketts, he was born at Camberwell in March 1895. He was educated at Harrow School. His progression to the University of Oxford was interrupted by the commencement of the First World War, with de Uphaugh being commissioned in October 1914 as a temporary second lieutenant in the Royal Fusiliers. He was confirmed in the rank of second lieutenant in April 1915, before being promoted to lieutenant in December of the same year. After the conclusion of the war, de Uphaugh proceeded to study at Christ Church, Oxford. While studying at Oxford, he made a single appearance in first-class cricket for Oxford University against Sussex at Hove in 1919. Batting twice in the match, he was dismissed for 4 runs in the Oxford first innings by George Cox, while in their second innings he was unbeaten on 43. After graduating from Oxford, de Uphaugh continued to serve in the British Army, transferring to the King's Own Royal West Kent Regiment in 1927, before being promoted to captain in March 1929. de Uphaugh died in October 1972 at Hollingbourne, Kent.
