= Dai Davies (cricketer) =

Welsh cricketer and Test match umpire

Personal information
- Full name: David Davies
- Born: 28 August 1896; Llanelli, Carmarthenshire, Wales
- Died: 16 July 1976 (aged 79); Llanelli, Carmarthenshire, Wales
- Batting: Right-handed
- Bowling: Right-arm off break Right-arm medium

Domestic team information
- Years: Team
- 1923–1939: Glamorgan
- 1923–1930: Wales

Umpiring information
- Tests umpired: 22 (1947–1958)
- FC umpired: 404 (1946–1961)

Career statistics
Competition	First-class
Matches	421
Runs scored	15,390
Batting average	24.27
100s/50s	16/73
Top score	216
Balls bowled	22,479
Wickets	275
Bowling average	35.02
5 wickets in innings	4
10 wickets in match	0
Best bowling	6/50
Catches/stumpings	198/–
- Source: Cricinfo, 7 August 2012

David "Dai" Davies (26 August 1896 – 16 July 1976) was a Welsh first-class cricketer and Test match umpire.

== Biography ==
Davies was born in Llanelli, Carmarthenshire. He worked in the steelworks in his home town, playing club cricket for Llanelli and some cricket for Carmarthenshire.

He made his first-class debut for Glamorgan in Swansea in 1923, when already in his late twenties, scoring 58 and 51 with the bat and taking four wickets against Northamptonshire. Over the course of a 16-year professional career, he scored more than 15,000 runs for the county, including 16 hundreds, in 421 first-class games. Although never close to international honours, he passed 1,000 runs in the season on 7 occasions, with 1,539 in 1930 his best return. Batting with Joe Hills against Sussex in 1928, he helped set a first-class record for Glamorgan for the eight wicket that has stood for over 80 years. A more than useful medium pace and off break bowler who took 275 wickets, he was also an outstanding fielder in the covers in his early years, taking 195 catches in all. Jack Hobbs commended Davies' fielding, describing him as the finest cover point he saw. He was a close contemporary of fellow Welshmen Cyril Walters and Emrys Davies, among the first Welsh cricketers to make an impact playing for Glamorgan.

The Second World War brought his playing days to a close – he was 43 years old in 1939 – but he continued to serve the game when first-class cricket resumed after the War by becoming an umpire in 1946. He officiated in the county game against Hampshire in 1948 which gave Glamorgan its first County Championship. After Hampshire followed on, and Davies gave the last Hampshire batsman Charles Knott out lbw with the team still 115 runs in arrears, he reputedly exclaimed "That's out and we've won the championship!".

He also became a Test umpire, standing in at least one Test match in England each summer from 1947 and 1958. He umpired 23 Test matches in all. He stood in the fifth Test against South Africa at the Oval in 1951. After consulting with fellow umpire Frank Chester, Davies gave Len Hutton out for obstructing the field, the only occasion of this dismissal arising in Test cricket. Hutton had miscued a hook shot against Athol Rowan, and hit the ball a second time to defend his stumps, impeding the South African wicketkeeper Russell Endean as he tried to take the catch.

Davies stood in his last first-class match in September 1961, after nearly 40 years on the first-class scene as either player or umpire. He suffered from arthritis in later years, and died in Llanelli.
