= Alan Rayment =

English cricketer (1928–2020)

Personal information
- Full name: Alan William Harrington Rayment
- Born: 29 May 1928; Finchley, Middlesex, England
- Died: 27 October 2020 (aged 92); Lymington, Hampshire, England
- Nickname: Punchy
- Batting: Right-handed
- Bowling: Unknown

Domestic team information
- Years: Team
- 1949–1958: Hampshire

Career statistics
Competition	First-class
Matches	199
Runs scored	6,338
Batting average	20.31
100s/50s	4/23
Top score	126
Balls bowled	1,205
Wickets	19
Bowling average	40.63
5 wickets in innings	–
10 wickets in match	–
Best bowling	4/75
Catches/stumpings	86/–
- Source: Cricinfo, 28 October 2020

Alan William Harrington Rayment (29 May 1928 — 27 October 2020) was an English first-class cricketer and social worker. Rayment played first-class cricket for Hampshire from 1949 to 1958, scoring over 6,000 runs in 198 matches. After retiring from playing, he held a number of occupations, most notably as a senior social worker for West Sussex County Council. From March 2020 to his death in October 2020, he was Hampshire's oldest surviving cricketer.

== Cricket career ==
The son of Samuel Rayment and his wife, Wennerloef, he was born in May 1928 at Finchley. He was educated at Finchley Grammar School. Whilst undertaking his National Service with the Royal Air Force, Rayment his debut in first-class cricket for the Combined Services cricket team against Northamptonshire at Northampton in 1947. A club cricketer for Finchley Cricket Club, it was while playing for the Middlesex Second XI in 1948 that he first came to the attention of Hampshire, then rebuilding under the captaincy and secretaryship of Desmond Eagar following the Second World War. Two months later, Eagar wrote to Finchley's secretary and Rayment's parents to request a meeting, in which he was offered a two-year contract to play for Hampshire. His debut for Hampshire followed in the 1949 County Championship against Glamorgan at Cardiff. Having made eight first-class appearances in 1949, he further established himself in the Hampshire side in 1950, with fifteen appearances. Rayment played two notable innings late in the 1950 season against Gloucestershire at Bournemouth. With Sam Cook and Tom Goddard spinning Gloucestershire to an innings victory, Rayment made scores of 58 and 94, which were the highest scores across both Hampshire innings. John Arlott described his performance as “the two best innings” he saw “by a young cricketer”.

Two years later in 1952, he recorded his first instance of making over 1,000 runs in a season, in addition to scoring his first two centuries. He made a third century in 1953 at Bristol, making 126 runs in a fourth wicket stand of 246 with Clifford Walker. He made his fourth and final century in 1955 against Somerset, which was arguably his most notable due to the difficult batting conditions at Weston-super-Mare. He made an attacking unbeaten 104 in Hampshire's second innings of 245 for 7 declared, after Somerset had been dismissed for 37 in their first innings; Hampshire went on to win the match by an innings. He made exactly 1,000 runs in 1956 (without making a century), and was a member of the Hampshire team which finished third in 1955 and second in 1958 — these were Hampshire's highest finishes in the County Championship to that point. Rayment played first-class cricket for Hampshire until 1958, making 198 appearances. In these, he scored 6,333 runs at an average of 20.36; alongside his four centuries, he also made 23 half centuries. He was noted for his quick feet as a batsman and as a cover fielder, which was attributed to expertise in ballroom dancing. As a fielder, he took 86 catches. Rayment was Hampshire's last professional to have solely played in three-day first-class matches, before the introduction of List A one-day cricket.

== Retirement and later life ==
Rayment retired from first-class cricket following the 1958 season to become an evangelist missionary. From the 1940s to the late 1950s, Rayment and his wife, Betty, ran a dancing school in a hotel adjacent to Northlands Road. He also coached at Lord's in 1959 (where he was offered the role of head coach of the Marylebone Cricket Club), and on occasion the Hampshire Second XI, with it being noted that he coached his fellow-cricketers through the perspective of a dance instructor. His missionary work was short-lived and he did not accept the head coach role at Lord's, with Rayment instead turning to teaching history, English, scripture and games at Princes Mead prep school in Winchester, before setting up an estate agents business in Southampton, which he sold in 1965 to retrain as a community worker at Westhill College in Birmingham. His retraining gained him employment in the 1970s as an assistant warden at Abbey Community Centre in Kilburn, and later as warden at Pollards Hill Community Centre in Merton. From London, he moved to West Sussex to become a senior community worker, and later social worker for West Sussex County Council. From 1982 to 1993, he was mostly self-employed as a bereavement counsellor and psychotherapist.

In 2013, he published his memoirs, Punchy Through the Covers, 1928-1949, which detailed his early life. In later life, he retained his interest in cricket by watching Hampshire and Lymington. He was a member of various cricket societies, including the Dorset Cricket Society and Hambledon Cricket Club. Away from cricket, he was a keen supporter of the Bournemouth Symphony Orchestra. With his wife, Betty, he had six children; they divorced in 1970, but remained good friends. His second marriage to Joan De Torre lasted until her death in 2005, with Rayment spending his final years with his partner, Elizabeth Lloyd. Following the death of John Manners in March 2020, Rayment became the oldest surviving Hampshire cricketer. Rayment died in Lymington Hospital in the New Forest on 27 October 2020, following a short illness. In tribute, then Hampshire chairman Rod Bransgrove said "what he embodied more than anything was the spirit of a Hampshire player and I have only ever known his as a warm and genial presence". At the time of his death, he had been working on the second part of his autobiography. This was completed posthumously by friends and was released in November 2021.
