= Clifford Walker (cricketer) =

English county cricketer (1919–1992)

Cliff Walker
Personal information
- Full name: Clifford Walker
- Born: Golcar, Yorkshire, England
- Died: 3 December 1992 (aged 73); Lindley, Yorkshire, England
- Batting: Right-handed
- Bowling: Right-arm medium

Domestic team information
- Years: Team
- 1947–1948: Yorkshire
- 1949–1954: Hampshire

Career statistics
Competition	First-class
Matches	131
Runs scored	5,258
Batting average	27.67
100s/50s	8/26
Top score	150*
Balls bowled	6,118
Wickets	53
Bowling average	49.33
5 wickets in innings	2
10 wickets in match	–
Best bowling	5/40
Catches/stumpings	89/–
- Source: Cricinfo, 18 September 2023

Clifford Walker (26 June 1919 – 3 December 1992) was an English first-class cricketer, who played five matches for Yorkshire between 1947 and 1948, and then 121 matches for Hampshire between 1949 and 1954.

== Early career with Yorkshire ==
Walker was born in Golcar, near Huddersfield in Yorkshire. A product of Slaithwaite Cricket Club, he was the professional at Golcar Cricket Club in the Huddersfield League in 1943 and 1944. He played for Brighouse in the Bradford League in 1945, before joining Windhill as their professional in 1946. He joined Yorkshire in 1947, making his debut in first-class cricket against Hampshire at Bradford in the 1947 County Championship. After playing against Ireland, he made two further appearances in the 1947 County Championship, before appearing once the following season against Nottinghamshire. In five first-class matches for Yorkshire, he scored 268 runs at an average of 38.28, with a highest score of 91; with his right-arm medium pace bowling, he took two wickets.

== Career with Hampshire ==
Walker left Yorkshire at the end of the 1948 season, and subsequently joined Hampshire for the 1949 season. He was one of a number of young Yorkshire-born cricketers signed by Hampshire under the auspices of Desmond Eagar, with Yorkshire-born Gilbert Dawson, Harold Dawson, and Derek Shackleton having joined before Walker. He made his first team debut for Hampshire against Glamorgan at Cardiff in the 1949 County Championship, and soon established himself as a regular member of the first eleven, making 27 appearances in his first season with Hampshire. In these, he scored 1,087 runs at an average of 26.51; he made his first two centuries, with scores of 103 not out against Glamorgan and 112 against Lancashire, as a result of which he gained his county cap. It was during the 1949 season that Walker would take his career best bowling figures with 5 for 40 against the Combined Services at Portsmouth, one of 22 wickets he took that season.

Walker's good form continued into 1950. He again passed a thousand runs for the season, with 1,225 runs from thirty matches, at an average of 28.28; he made a further two centuries during the season, most notably an unbeaten 103 against his former county. Utilised again for his occasional medium pace bowling, he had success against Worcestershire when he dismissed four of the last five Worcestershire batsmen for the cost of eight runs. For the third consecutive season, Walker passed a thousand runs in a season in 1951, scoring 1,027 from 28 matches at an average of 25.04; he made one century, an unbeaten 114 against Oxford University at Basingstoke. Following the retirement of wicket-keeper and opening batsman Neil McCorkell at the end of the 1951 season, Walker was chosen ahead of the 1952 season to fill the now vacant openers slot, which would see him partner Neville Rogers. At the beginning of July, a cracked rib ruled Walker out of action until late August. He struggled in his first season as an opening, scoring 317 runs at an average of 18.64 from eleven matches.

Walker returned to the middle order for the 1953 season, which improved his batting fortunes. By June, he had topped the national batting averages with an average of 65.50. From 27 matches in 1953, he scored 1,302 runs at an average of 36.16; he scored three centuries, including his highest career score of 150 not out against Gloucestershire, having shared in a partnership of 246 runs for the fourth wicket with Alan Rayment. After making three appearances for Hampshire in the 1954 County Championship, Walker abruptly cancelled his professional contract to return to his families cinema business in Yorkshire. In 126 first-class matches for Hampshire, Walker scored 4,490 runs at an average of 27.26. As a part-time medium pacer, he took 51 wickets at a bowling average of 49.88, taking two five wicket hauls. He fielded at slip, and took 88 catches.

== Later life and death ==
Back in Yorkshire, Walker played club cricket for David Brown Tractors works team. Walker died in December 1992 in Lindley, Huddersfield.
