= Jim Bailey (cricketer) =

English cricketer

James Bailey
Personal information
- Full name: James Bailey
- Born: 6 April 1908; Otterbourne, Hampshire, England
- Died: 10 February 1988 (aged 79); Southampton, Hampshire, England
- Batting: Left-handed
- Bowling: Slow left-arm orthodox

Domestic team information
- Years: Team
- 1927–1933: Hampshire
- 1934–1935: Marylebone Cricket Club
- 1938–1952: Hampshire

Career statistics
| Competition | First-class |
|---|---|
| Matches | 248 |
| Runs scored | 9,501 |
| Batting average | 24.93 |
| 100s/50s | 5/51 |
| Top score | 133 |
| Balls bowled | 30,764 |
| Wickets | 473 |
| Bowling average | 27.24 |
| 5 wickets in innings | 25 |
| 10 wickets in match | 5 |
| Best bowling | 7/7 |
| Catches/stumpings | 63/– |
- Source: Cricinfo, 27 January 2010

James Bailey (6 April 1908 — 10 February 1988) was an English first-class cricketer. An all-rounder, he played first-class cricket for Hampshire in two spells, making 242 appearances for the county between 1927 and 1952. He scored over 9,000 runs for Hampshire and took over 450 wickets, enjoying much of his success as a cricketer following the Second World War. He achieved the double of 1,000 runs and 100 wickets in 1948, and as of 2026 he remains the last Hampshire player to achieve this feat.

== Cricket career ==
=== First spell at Hampshire ===
Bailey was born in April 1908 at Otterbourne, Hampshire. He made his debut in first-class cricket for Hampshire against Middlesex at Bournemouth in the 1927 County Championship, just after his 19th birthday. From 1927 to 1931, he played a handful of matches per season, but achieved little success. He found form in the 1931 season and earned an extended run in the Hampshire side, establishing himself as a left-handed batsman. In 27 matches in 1931, he scored 922 runs at an average of 19.61, and made his first century (104) in the final match of the season against Nottinghamshire, taking five hours to reach three-figures. Opening the batting alongside Johnny Arnold, Wisden noted how his slow batting style was the opposite of his opening partner, who was seen as an aggressive batsman, lamenting that spectators had to be "subjected" firstly to Bailey's slow scoring, followed by the slow scoring of Phil Mead at number three. Bailey also took 26 wickets with his slow left-arm orthodox bowling in 1931, which included a five wicket haul (5 for 51) against Gloucestershire.

The following season, he made the same number of appearances and further established himself, this time as an all-rounder, by taking 76 wickets at an average of 21.90, and taking his career-best figures of 7 for 7 against Nottinghamshire at Southampton. His performances in the first half of the 1932 season earned him a place in the Players team for the Gentlemen v Players match at The Oval. In 1932 and 1933, he made over 500 and 900 runs respectively, and made a second century against Leicestershire in 1933, this time from the middle order. However, his bowling fell away in 1933, with Bailey taking just eight wickets. However, when he bowled well his batting form dropped, and conversely, when he batted well, his bowling form fell away. Seeking a solution to this, Bailey left Hampshire at the end of the 1933 season and joined the staff at Lord's in order to qualify by residency for Middlesex.

=== Lord's staff and return to Hampshire ===
He spent two years at Lord's, during which he made five first-class appearances for the Marylebone Cricket Club. He joined the Lord's staff at the same time as the emergency Denis and Leslie Compton, Bill Edrich, and Jack Robertson in the Middlesex team. Thus, after two years, he saw little prospect of progressing into the Middlesex eleven and left Lord's to play for Accrington Cricket Club in the Lancashire League, where he became the first English professional to score 1,000 runs in a season. Bailey returned to Hampshire in 1938, following the retirement of Mead. Given he was still contracted to Accrington (for whom he played for at weekends), Hampshire persuaded him to play for them in northern mid-week fixtures. He rejoined Hampshire fully the following season, having his most successful season, scoring 1,329 runs at an average of 32.41, making one century and eight half centuries. In August 1939, he was involved in a car accident with Charlie Knott, when the car they were driving overturned on its way to Nottingham; neither were seriously injured.

=== Post-war cricket and later life ===
With the suspension of first-class cricket during the Second World War, Bailey played for Idle in the Bradford Cricket League. He returned to Hampshire following the war and would have the most successful period of his first-class career. In 1946, he passed 1,000 runs for the season in making 1,410 runs at an average of exactly 30. A leg injury hampered his ability to bowl in 1946, affecting his economy rate; despite this, he still managed to take 35 wickets. In the 1947 season, he scored 977 runs and took 53 wickets. The 1948 season was to prove highly successful for Bailey, with him achieving the double of 1,000 runs and 100 wickets for the season. His 1,399 runs came at an average of 31.79, while his 121 wickets came at an average of 18.13 and included nine five wicket hauls. He remains, as 2026, the last Hampshire player to achieve the double. Following his bowling success in 1948, he was considered one of the best slow-left arm orthodox bowlers in England, to such an extent that the Hampshire Telegraph suggested he be included in the England team for the 5th Test of the 1948 Ashes Series. He had further success in 1949, scoring 1,254 runs at an average of 26.68, in addition to taking 86 wickets, albeit at a higher average of 30.95. In his post-war years with Hampshire, he bowled in partnership with fellow spinners Knott and Gerry Hill.

In the winter following the 1949 season, he took up a coaching post in South Africa at the Wanderers Club, succeeding Emrys Davies. In April 1950, he announced his retirement to take on business appointments. Two years later, following several injuries, he was an emergency selection in the Hampshire side for their County Championship match against Warwickshire. This took his number of first-class matches for Hampshire to 242, in which he had scored 9,302 runs at an average of 24.93, making five centuries and 51 half centuries. With the ball, he took 467 wickets at an average of 26.97, taking 25 five wicket hauls, in addition to taking ten-wickets in a match on five occasions.

Bailey continued to play club cricket for the Trojans, and friendly matches for Hampshire Club and Ground. During one friendly match, played against South Wilts, he recommended the broadcaster Michael Parkinson for a trial at Hampshire. He also served on the Hampshire committee. Besides playing cricket, he was an amateur billiards player who competed in the English Amateur Billiards Championship. Bailey died at Southampton in February 1988.
