= Edward Henty (cricketer) =

English cricketer

Edward Henty (11 August 1839 – 20 January 1900) was an English first-class cricketer who played for Kent County Cricket Club as a professional between 1865 and 1881. He was born in Hawkhurst in Kent and died at Lewisham in 1900 aged 60.

Henty was a right-handed batsman and a wicket-keeper. He was a professional at the Prince's Cricket Ground in the 1870s and also ran billiard halls in what is now south-east London. His obituary in Wisden Cricketers' Almanack in 1901 quoted Arthur Haygarth's view that he was "above the average" as a batsman, though inclined to be too "steady". But he mostly batted in the lower order and his career average was less than eight runs per innings. Almost all of his first-class cricket was for Kent: 116 out of 119 first-class games. He did not appear in the important representative matches such as Gentlemen v Players, though he did play single games for the "Players of the South", the "United South of England Eleven" and for the Single in the 1871 Married v Single game, which was counted as first-class. At the end of his playing career in 1881, Henty was granted a benefit match by Kent, in which a 13-strong team from Kent played an 11-strong "England" eleven in the first game of the Canterbury Cricket Week, with newspaper reports indicating an attendance of more than 4,000 people. The report in the Evening Standard stated that Henty was "known as a well-conducted and thoroughly deserving professional".

Henty became a cricket umpire, standing in a few important games such as Gentlemen v Players in the 1870s, and then more regularly in county matches across the 1880s and up to 1894.

== Bibliography ==
- Carlaw, Derek (2020). Kent County Cricketers, A to Z: Part One (1806–1914) (PDF). Cardiff: ACS.
