= Isaac Salmon (cricketer) =

New Zealand cricketer

Personal information
- Full name: Isaac John Salmon
- Born: 16 November 1851; Sydney, Australia
- Died: 26 November 1932 (aged 81); Palmerston North, New Zealand
- Source: Cricinfo, 27 October 2020

Isaac John Salmon (16 November 1851 – 26 November 1932) was a New Zealand cricketer. He played in six first-class matches for Wellington from 1873 to 1882.

== See also ==
- List of Wellington representative cricketers
