= Greg Mike =

American painter

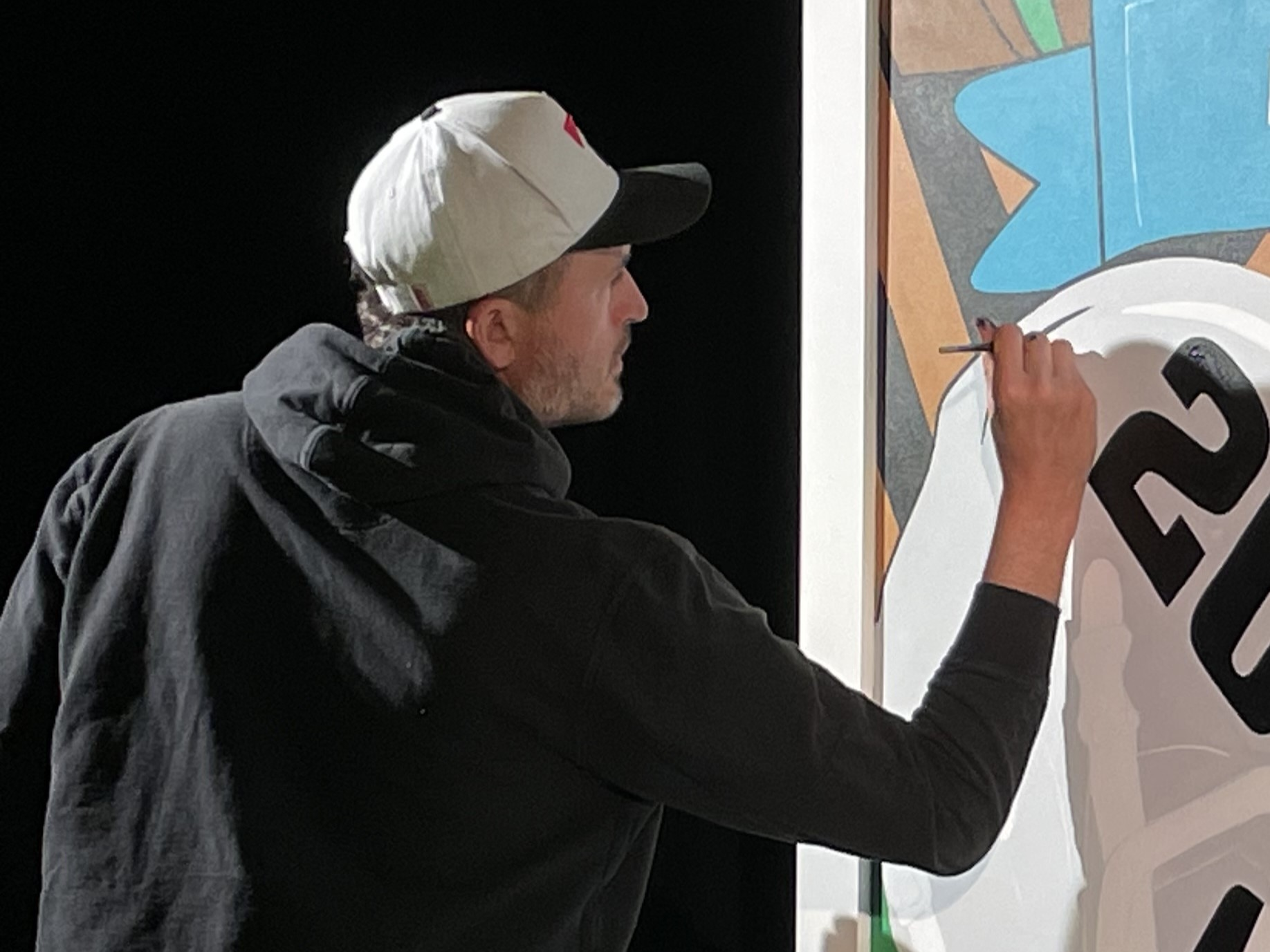
- Greg Mike in 2025
- Known for: Public art Loudmouf Icon
- Website: gregmike.com

Gregory Michael Mensching, commonly known as Greg Mike, is an American artist. He began doing graffiti at age 13, and transitioned into murals in his later twenties. He is known for street art, mural painting and Loudmouf Icon in the United States, Australia, Canada and Switzerland. In 2008, he founded ABV Gallery and Agency in Atlanta, GA which exhibits artists from around the world and works with brands on commercial design projects.

== NFTs ==
Mike has been selling NFTs of his artwork since 2021, auctioning his art on NFT platform Nifty Gateway. His most famous work, the series "MAD CANS", consists in a series of digital collectable cans which also include a physical Infinite Object, raising over $3,000,000.

== Works ==
- "Pigment of my Imagination" Solo Exhibition at Maxwell Colette, Chicago, Illinois, 2014.
- 2012: 'With Your Friends' Festival
- 2015: Mural unveiling at Whisky Park
- 2015: Vision Art Festival
- 2016: Atlanta Art Culture
- 2016: Outside Lands Art Festival
- 2016: LA Public School in Street Art
- 2016: Pow! Wow! Worcester, 10-day mural art festival

== Awards ==
- Mayor Joseph Petty presented key to the city of Worcester, Massachusetts Award to Mike in September 2016.
- Best Established Visual Artist - Creative Loafing 2017
- 2017 Notable Georgians Award

== See also ==
- List of street artists
