= Duncan Wild =

English cricketer (born 1962)

Duncan James Wild is an English former cricketer active from 1980 to 1990 who played for Northamptonshire (Northants). He was born in Northampton on 28 November 1962. He appeared in 119 first-class matches as a lefthanded batsman who bowled right arm medium pace. He scored 3,688 runs with a highest score of 144, one of five centuries, and took 66 wickets with a best performance of four for 4.
