= Jimmy Bridges (cricketer) =

English cricketer

Personal information
- Full name: James John Bridges
- Born: 28 June 1887; Timsbury, Somerset, England
- Died: 26 September 1966 (aged 79); Hackney, London, England
- Batting: Right-handed
- Bowling: Right-arm fast-medium
- Role: Bowler

Domestic team information
- Years: Team
- 1911–1929: Somerset
- FC debut: 11 May 1911 Somerset v Hampshire
- Last FC: 27 July 1929 Somerset v Gloucestershire

Career statistics
Competition	First-class
Matches	216
Runs scored	2,418
Batting average	10.07
100s/50s	0/2
Top score	99*
Balls bowled	38,251
Wickets	686
Bowling average	25.67
5 wickets in innings	45
10 wickets in match	4
Best bowling	7/41
Catches/stumpings	128/–
- Source: CricketArchive, 18 October 2009

James John Bridges (28 June 1887 – 26 September 1966) was an English cricketer who played for Somerset from 1911 to 1929.

Bridges was a right-arm fast-medium bowler who batted right-handed. Before the First World War he played as a professional, but after the war he was one of Somerset's many amateurs. He played in 216 first-class matches and took 686 wickets at an average of 25.67 with best figures of 7/41. He achieved 5 wickets in an innings on 45 occasions and 10 wickets in a match four times. He was a tail-end batsman who played 348 innings, with 108 not outs, scoring 2,418 runs with a highest score of 99 not out. He made two fifties and took 128 catches.

Bridges was the bowler when Jack Hobbs scored the run that took him to his 126th career century and so equalled the then world record of W G Grace. He then dismissed Hobbs for 101.
