= Ted James (cricketer) =

English cricketer

Albert Edward James (7 August 1924 – 2 April 2013) was an English cricketer who played first-class cricket for Sussex. He was a right-hand batsman and right arm medium pace bowler who in 12 years of county cricket took 843 wickets. He was born in Newton Longville, Buckinghamshire and died at Eastbourne, East Sussex.

James began his cricket career with Buckinghamshire, playing four matches in the 1947 Minor Counties Championship. In 1948 he joined Sussex. He made his first-class debut against Yorkshire in May of that year, taking four wickets in his first match including that of England captain Norman Yardley. He was dropped from the first team mid-season, but finished his maiden season with 33 wickets at an average of 25.12.

James was a regular in the Sussex side for the next ten years, playing 299 matches for the club. He was awarded his county cap in 1950 and awarded a benefit season in 1961. He passed 50 wickets in a season for every year between 1950 and 1959, twice topping 100 for the season. His most prolific season was 1955 when he took 111 wickets at 21.31, including his best career figures of 9 for 60 against Yorkshire. The one wicket to evade him in that innings was that of Brian Close who was bowled by Robin Marlar.

James took 27 five-wicket hauls in his career, two of which came against touring international teams. The first came in 1953 when he recorded figures of 5/96 against the visiting Australians. The second was in 1959 when he took 5/65 against the Indian tourists.
