= Geoffrey Attenborough =

Australian cricketer

Personal information
- Full name: Geoffrey Robert Attenborough
- Born: 17 January 1951 (age 75); Mile End, Adelaide, Australia
- Batting: Right-handed
- Bowling: Left-arm fast-medium
- Role: Bowler

Domestic team information
- Years: Team
- 1972/73–1980/81: South Australia

Career statistics
Competition	FC	LA
Matches	57	9
Runs scored	738	5
Batting average	10.39	1.25
100s/50s	0/1	0/0
Top score	54	4
Balls bowled	12,566	528
Wickets	193	10
Bowling average	31.96	31.60
5 wickets in innings	8	0
10 wickets in match	2	–
Best bowling	7/90	3/25
Catches/stumpings	20/–	3/–
- Source: ESPNcricinfo, 7 March 2024

Geoffrey Robert Attenborough (born 17 January 1951) is a former South Australian cricketer who is considered unlucky by some judges to not have played for Australia.

== Career ==
=== Cricket ===
Attenborough is a left-arm fast-medium bowler and right-hand batsman who played for the Adelaide Cricket Club before making his debut for South Australia on 3 March 1973 against Western Australia at the WACA, taking 2/64 and scoring one and five.

Attenborough soon gained a reputation for his ability to swing the ball both ways and led the South Australian attack throughout the late 1970s. He gained the nickname "Horse" for his willingness to bowl long spells in the heat of the afternoon as well as "Scatters", for reasons less well known.

In 1977/78 Attenborough achieved his best match figures of 11/168 against Victoria at the Melbourne Cricket Ground. With the defection of many leading Australian cricketers to World Series Cricket in 1977, it was thought that Attenborough would be chosen to lead the Australian Test team attack; however he was overlooked.

Attenborough experienced his best season in 1979/80, taking 44 wickets at 23.70, the third highest wicket taker that season behind Ashley Mallett and Dennis Lillee, but could not force his way into the Test team.

Attenborough retired from cricket in 1981, having played 57 first-class matches, taking 193 wickets at 31.96 with best bowling figures of 7/90 and scoring 738 runs at 10.39 with a highest score of 54. He also played nine List A matches, taking 10 wickets at 31.60 and scoring five runs at 1.25.

=== Post cricket ===
Following his retirement, Attenborough runs Ashross Agencies, which supplies the embroidery on the Australian team's uniforms, and coaches at Adelaide Cricket Club.

== See also ==
- List of South Australian representative cricketers
