= George Cox Jr =

English cricketer and footballer

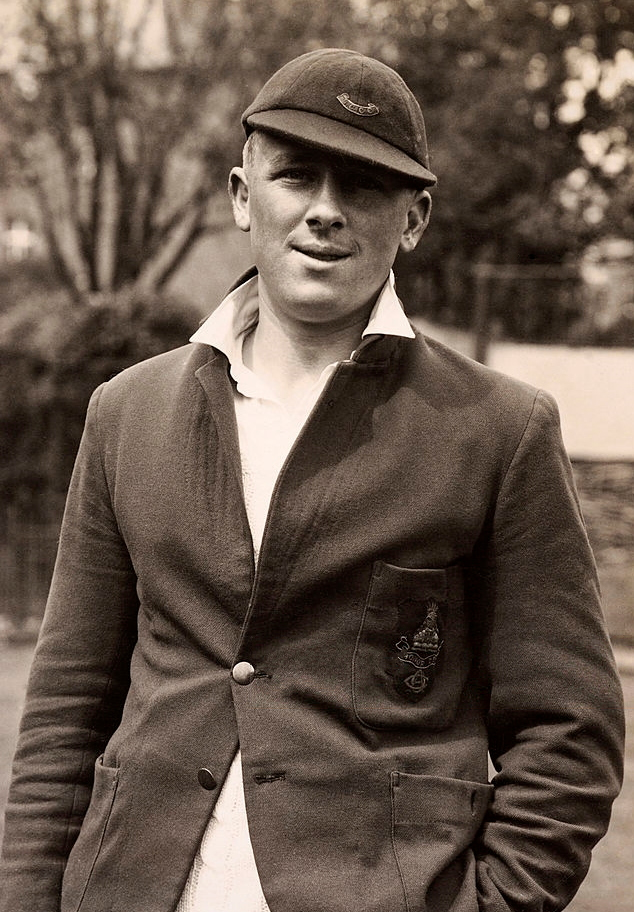
- Cox in about 1933

Personal information
- Born: 23 August 1911; Warnham, Sussex, England
- Died: 30 March 1985 (aged 73); Burgess Hill, Sussex, England
- Height: 5 ft 9 in (175 cm)
- Batting: Right-handed
- Bowling: Right-arm medium

Career statistics
Competition	First-class
Matches	455
Runs scored	22,949
Batting average	32.92
100s/50s	50/97
Top score	234*
Balls bowled	13,723
Wickets	192
Bowling average	30.91
5 wickets in innings	3
10 wickets in match	0
Best bowling	6/125
Catches/stumpings	141/–
- Source: CricketArchive, 7 June 2017

George Cox (23 August 1911 – 30 March 1985) was an English first-class cricketer who played for Sussex. He was also a footballer who played for Arsenal and Fulham.

== Career ==
Born in Warnham, Sussex, as a cricketer Cox was primarily an attacking right-handed batsman, also an occasional right-arm medium-pace bowler and in his youth a fine cover fielder. Cox played for Sussex and had a first-class career which started in 1931. He went on to play 455 first-class matches, making 22949 runs at an average of 32.92, that included 50 centuries, with a highest score of 234 not out.

Cox also played football for Arsenal, whom he joined in November 1933. Cox stayed at Highbury for the following three years, where he played predominantly in the Football Combination. In the Combination, Cox scored 53 times in 75 games for the Gunners. He played seven times for the first team, scoring once for the club.

In the summer of 1936, Cox moved to Fulham for a transfer fee of £150. After a sole season with Fulham, Cox then journeyed to Luton Town. It was at the Hatters that his footballing career ended.

He was a cricket coach at Sussex from 1960 to 1964.

== Personal life ==
He was generally known as George Cox junior in order to distinguish him from his father George Cox senior, who was also a successful player for the same county. He was a notably witty conversationalist and letter writer. Cox died on 30 March 1985 in Burgess Hill, Sussex.
