= Charles Grove =

English cricketer (1912–1982)

Personal information
- Full name: Charles William Collard Grove
- Born: 16 December 1912; Aston, Birmingham, England
- Died: 15 February 1982 (aged 69); Solihull, Warwickshire, England
- Batting: Right-handed
- Bowling: Right-arm medium-fast

Domestic team information
- Years: Team
- 1938–1953: Warwickshire
- 1954: Worcestershire

Career statistics
Competition	FC
Matches	217
Runs scored	3,161
Batting average	11.57
100s/50s	1/4
Top score	104*
Balls bowled	43,185
Wickets	744
Bowling average	22.66
5 wickets in innings	28
10 wickets in match	5
Best bowling	9-39
Catches/stumpings	90/0
- Source: CricketArchive, 11 November 2008

Charles William Collard Grove (16 December 1912 – 15 February 1982) was an English first-class cricketer who took over 700 wickets during the course of over 200 games in the mid-20th century, mostly for Warwickshire. He had one season for Worcestershire at the end of his career.

Grove appeared for Warwickshire's Second XI in the Minor Counties Championship as early as 1933, but his first-class debut was five years later in June 1938 against Northamptonshire, when he took 3-53 including the wicket of opposing captain Robert Nelson at Edgbaston. His two other first-class games that summer brought Grove no wickets, but in 1939 he took 37, including two five-wicket hauls, and (said his Wisden obituarist) showed promise before the Second World War intervened.

He played a number of matches during the war, but his first-class career did not resume until 1947. He took 98 wickets that season, and though this figure was reduced to 60 the following year, he managed at least 80 every season from 1949 until the end of his Warwickshire career in 1953. A notable performance in 1950 was his first-innings 8-38 against the West Indians, which helped Warwickshire to become the only county that season to defeat the tourists. He passed fifty on five occasions in his career, all between 1947 and 1949, including one century: 104 not out against Leicestershire in late August 1948; he scored his runs in 80 minutes.

In 1951, Grove's benefit year, he took 100 wickets in a season for the first time, finishing with 110 at 18.52. The 1952 season saw him top this total as he helped Warwickshire to the County Championship title: he picked up 118 wickets, including ten or more in a match on four occasions, and claimed a career best 9-39 versus Sussex in June. As of 2008, only Jack Bannister (twice) has recorded better innings figures for Warwickshire since Grove's achievement.

Grove ended his Warwickshire career after the 1953 season, and then had a single year with Worcestershire, playing only the middle part of the season. Although he took 8-66 against Gloucestershire in late May, he was not particularly successful, finishing the year with 42 wickets at an average of slightly over 30. His final first-class outing came against Derbyshire in mid-July, and was an unsuccessful experience for Grove: he took 0-68 in the match and made a duck in his only innings. He later played club cricket in the Birmingham League.
