= Colin Johnson (cricketer) =

English cricketer (born 1947)

Colin Johnson (born 5 September 1947 in Pocklington, Yorkshire, England) is an English first-class cricketer, who played 100 matches for Yorkshire County Cricket Club between 1969 and 1979.

He scored 2,960 runs as a right-handed middle order batsman at 21.44, with two centuries against Somerset and Gloucestershire. In 102 one day games he scored 1,615 runs at 20.18, with a top score of 73 not out. He also took four first-class wickets with his occasional off breaks, and two more in one day cricket.

He was a stalwart for Yorkshire's Second XI, playing from 1966 to 1985, and captaining the side after he left the first-class scene. He was awarded the captaincy at the expense of Barrie Leadbeater, who had been promised the job, but was then released by Yorkshire and became a first-class umpire.

Johnson worked full-time in the field of life insurance, once his playing days had ended.
