= George Brockwell =

English cricketer (1809–1876)

George Brockwell (14 August 1809 – 12 December 1876) was an English first-class cricketer active 1844–57 who played for Surrey. He was born in Kingston-upon-Thames and died in Hackney. He played in 44 first-class matches.
