= Emile Kriek =

South African cricketer (born 1989)

Personal information
- Full name: Emile Christiaan Kriek
- Born: 11 December 1989 (age 36); Pretoria, South Africa
- Batting: Right-handed
- Bowling: Right-arm medium
- Role: Batsman

Domestic team information
- Years: Team
- 2008/09–2015/16: Boland
- FC debut: 8 January 2009 Boland v South Western Districts
- Last FC: February 11 2016 Boland v Eastern Province
- LA debut: 1 February 2009 Boland v Gauteng
- Last LA: 24 January 2015 Boland v Gauging

Career statistics
Competition	FC	LA	T20
Matches	54	41	18
Runs scored	2,167	901	417
Batting average	22.81	23.10	26.06
100s/50s	2/10	1/4	0/3
Top score	149	102	91*
Catches/stumpings	53/–	19/–	10/–
- Source: ESPNcricinfo, 6 November 2022

Emile Christiaan Kriek (born 11 December 1989) is a former South African cricketer who played for Boland. He is a right-handed batsman and right-arm medium pace bowler. Kriek made his first-class debut on 8 January 2009 against South Western Districts.
