= George Cox Sr =

English cricketer

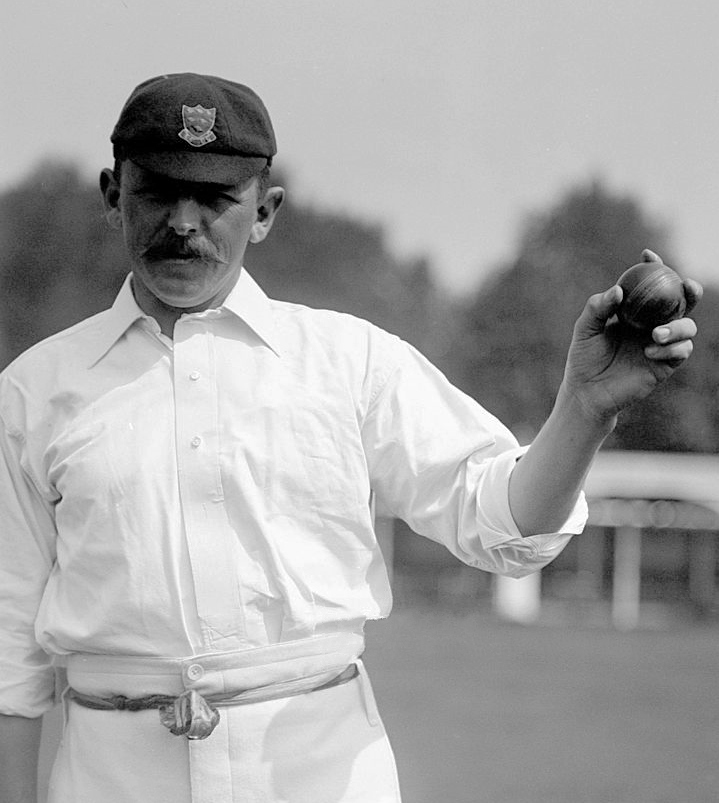

Personal information
- Born: 29 November 1873; Warnham, Sussex, England
- Died: 23 March 1949 (aged 75); Dorking, Surrey, England
- Batting: Right-handed
- Bowling: Left-arm medium; Slow left-arm orthodox

Career statistics
| Competition | First-class |
|---|---|
| Matches | 634 |
| Runs scored | 14,633 |
| Batting average | 18.73 |
| 100s/50s | 2/54 |
| Top score | 167* |
| Balls bowled | 106,180 |
| Wickets | 1,843 |
| Bowling average | 22.86 |
| 5 wickets in innings | 111 |
| 10 wickets in match | 13 |
| Best bowling | 9/50 |
| Catches/stumpings | 552/– |
- Source: CricketArchive, 13 April 2023

George Rubens Cox (29 November 1873 – 23 March 1949) was an English first-class cricketer who played for Sussex. In the later part of his life he became generally known as George Cox senior in order to distinguish him from his son George Cox junior, who was also a successful player for the same county.

Cox's first-class career lasted from 1895 to 1928. He was a useful right-handed batsman, with 14633 runs at 18.73, including two centuries. He was also a fine fielder, holding 552 catches, mostly close to the wicket. However he was chiefly noted for his left-arm bowling, in his first few years at medium-pace but thereafter principally orthodox spin. He took 1843 wickets at 22.86, with best innings figures of 9/50.

In 1926, at the age of 52, he took 17 Warwickshire wickets for 106 runs at Horsham, which remains the best match analysis for the county. He still holds a second county record, that for the last wicket. In 1908, he put on 156 with Harry Butt at Cambridge against Cambridge University. When Cox played his highest innings, 167 not out against Hampshire at Chichester in 1906, he and Butt added 116 for the last wicket.

After his playing days he became the official county coach. He was made an honorary life member of the club in 1937. Only Maurice Tate had previously received a similar honour.
