= Daniel Day (cricketer) =

English cricketer

Personal information
- Full name: Daniel Day
- Born: 14 June 1807; Streatham, London, England
- Died: 22 November 1887 (aged 80); Southampton, Hampshire, England
- Batting: Right-handed
- Bowling: Right-arm roundarm fast-medium

Domestic team information
- Years: Team
- 1846–1852: Surrey
- 1842–1845 & 1849–1850: Hampshire

Career statistics
Competition	FC
Matches	50
Runs scored	395
Batting average	5.56
100s/50s	–/1
Top score	70
Balls bowled	4,309
Wickets	252
Bowling average	11.86
5 wickets in innings	22
10 wickets in match	8
Best bowling	8/?
Catches/stumpings	36/–
- Source: Cricinfo, 27 April 2010

Daniel Day (14 June 1807 – 22 November 1887) was an English first-class cricketer. Day was a right-handed batsman who bowled right-arm roundarm fast-medium. Day is widely regarded as one of the best bowlers of early English cricket.

In 1842, Day played a key part in the establishment of the Antelope Ground, with Day himself being installed in the Antelope Hotel.

Day represented Hampshire teams in the period before the formation of the current Hampshire club, making his first-class debut in 1842 against the Marylebone Cricket Club. From 1842 to 1850, he played 15 first-class matches for Hampshire. In these matches he scored a single half century score of 70 with the bat against the Marylebone Cricket Club. With the ball he took 96 wickets at a bowling average of 8.42.

Day also represented Surrey from 1846 to 1852, making his debut for the county against Kent. Day played 23 first-class matches for Surrey, taking 133 wickets at an average of 13.97.

Day also played first-class cricket for the All England Eleven, South of England and the Surrey Club. In his overall first-class career he took 252 wickets from 50 matches at an average of 11.86, with 22 five wicket hauls and 8 ten wicket hauls in a match. Day's exact best bowling figures are unknown, only that his greatest haul in an innings was 8 wickets.

Day also stood as an umpire in four first-class matches from 1851 to 1865. Day died on 22 November 1887 at Southampton, Hampshire.
