= 1949 County Championship =

British cricket tournament

- Cricket format: First-class cricket
- Tournament format: League system
- Champions: Middlesex & Yorkshire
- Participants: 17
- Matches: 221
- Most runs: John Langridge, (Sussex); 2,441
- Most wickets: Tom Goddard, (Gloucestershire); 152

The 1949 County Championship was the 50th officially organised running of the County Championship.

The championship was shared for the first time in its history between Middlesex County Cricket Club and Yorkshire County Cricket Club.

== Table ==
- 12 points for a win
- 6 points to each team in a match in which scores finish level
- 4 points for first innings lead in a lost or drawn match
- 2 points for tie on first innings in a lost or drawn match

If no play possible on the first two days, the match played to one-day laws with 8 points for a win.

	Team	P	W	L	D	No Dec	1st Inns Lead	Pts
=1	Middlesex	26	14	3	9	0	6	192
=1	Yorkshire	26	14	2	10	0	6	192
3	Worcestershire	26	12	7	7	0	7	172
4	Warwickshire	26	12	5	8	1	6	168
5	Surrey	26	11	8	6	1	6	156
6	Northamptonshire	26	10	7	9	0	5	140
7	Gloucestershire	26	10	7	7	2	3	132
8	Glamorgan	26	7	6	12	1	9	120
=9	Essex	26	7	9	10	0	6	108
=9	Somerset	26	8	15	3	0	3	108
=11	Lancashire	26	6	7	13	0	7	100
=11	Nottinghamshire	26	6	5	13	2	7	100
=13	Kent	26	7	15	4	0	3	96
=13	Sussex	26	7	10	7	2	3	96
15	Derbyshire	26	6	13	6	1	4	88
16	Hampshire	26	6	13	6	1	3	84
17	Leicestershire	26	3	14	8	1	5	56
