= John Freeman (cricketer) =

English cricketer

John Robert Freeman (3 September 1883 – 8 August 1958) was an English cricketer active from 1905 to 1928 who played for Essex. He was born in Lewisham and died in Napsbury. He appeared in 337 first-class matches as a righthanded batsman and wicketkeeper who sometimes bowled right arm medium pace. He scored 14,602 runs with a highest score of 286 among 26 centuries and completed 230 catches with 47 stumpings. He took ten wickets with a best performance of three for 31.
