= Ernest Cooke =

English cricket umpire

Ernest Cooke was a test match umpire . Born in 1899 he joined the Nottinghamshire ground staff but did not make a first class appearance. He turned to umpiring in 1936 and stood in the Ashes test at Trent Bridge in 1948. He retired from the first class list in 1956 and died the following year in Eastwood.
