= Frank Chester (umpire) =

English cricketer and umpire

Personal information
- Full name: Frank Chester
- Born: 20 January 1895; Bushey, Hertfordshire, England
- Died: 8 April 1957 (aged 62); Bushey, Hertfordshire, England
- Batting: Right-handed
- Bowling: Off breaks
- Role: Umpire

Domestic team information
- Years: Team
- 1912–1914: Worcestershire

Umpiring information
- Tests umpired: 48 (1924–1955)

Career statistics
Competition	First-class
Matches	55
Runs scored	1,773
Batting average	23.95
100s/50s	4/4
Top score	178*
Balls bowled	5,143
Wickets	81
Bowling average	31.61
5 wickets in innings	2
10 wickets in match	0
Best bowling	6/43
Catches/stumpings	25/–
- Source: Cricinfo, 29 September 2009

Frank Chester (20 January 1895 – 8 April 1957) was briefly an English first-class cricketer before the First World War. After losing an arm in active service in 1917, he was a Test cricket umpire for 31 years. Wisden stated in his obituary that he "raised umpiring to a higher level than had ever been known in the history of cricket".

Chester was born in Bushey. An all-rounder, Alec Hearne suggested that he qualify for Worcestershire. Chester played as a right-handed middle-order batsman and a right-arm bowler of off breaks in 55 first-class matches for Worcestershire as a teenager from 1912 to 1914. In 1913, when he was 17 years old, he scored 108 against Somerset to become the youngest player then to score a county century, a record that still stood until the 1950s. During 1913 Chester was summoned to meet Dr W G Grace who wished to congratulate him on a century scored at Lord's that season. He was praised in the 1913 Wisden as the "youngest professional regularly engaged in first-class cricket ... Very few players in the history of cricket have shown such form at the age of seventeen and a half". In 1914, he scored his highest first-class score, 178 not out, against Essex.

He volunteered to serve in the First World War and joined the Royal Field Artillery in a battery commanded by Major Allsopp, captain of the Worcestershire Second Eleven. He served at the Second Battle of Loos and moved with his unit to Salonika he lost his right arm below the elbow in July 1917 after a shrapnel wound became gangrenous, ending his cricket playing career.

Chester turned to umpiring when he returned to England, using an artificial arm to make the necessary signals, and stood in his first first-class match in 1922, showing early promise and an uncompromising fairness. In his first county match as an umpire, between Essex and Somerset at Leyton, he gave both captains out, J. W. H. T. Douglas lbw and John Daniell stumped. He was widely recognised as the best umpire in England for many years. Sir Donald Bradman said he was the greatest umpire under whom he had played, but Chester objected to the strident appealing of the visiting Australians in 1948 and 1953, and did not stand in the 1953 Ashes Tests after the First Test.

One unusual decision was when Sonny Ramadhin bowled Doug Insole off his pads in the Test between England and West Indies at Trent Bridge in 1950. Chester doggedly stuck to his decision to give Insole out lbw rather than bowled, claiming that he raised his finger to mark the dismissal in the time between the ball touching Insole's pads and then hitting the stumps.

Chester stood in what was then a world record 48 Tests from 1924 to 1955. The record was later passed by Dickie Bird. Two years after officiating in his last Test match, Chester died in the town of his birth, Bushey, Hertfordshire. For much of his later years, he experienced stomach ulcers, a painful complaint that created an irascible temper that marred his decision-making towards the end of his career. E.W. Swanton described him as "as nearly infallible as a man could be in his profession".
