= Francis Rogers (cricketer) =

English cricketer

Personal information
- Full name: Francis Galpin Rogers
- Born: 7 April 1897; Bristol, England
- Died: 28 July 1967 (aged 70); Dorchester, Dorset, England
- Batting: Right-handed
- Role: Batsman

Domestic team information
- Years: Team
- 1924–1931: Gloucestershire
- 1924/25–1933/34: Europeans
- 1924–1929: Army
- 1924: Combined Services
- 1929: MCC
- 1933/34: Viceroy's XI
- 1933/34: Madras
- FC debut: 10 May 1924 Gloucestershire v Yorkshire
- Last FC: 3 February 1934 Madras v MCC

Career statistics
Competition	First-class
Matches	37
Runs scored	1309
Batting average	22.18
100s/50s	1/8
Top score	154
Catches/stumpings	22/–
- Source: CricketArchive, 17 May 2008

Francis Galpin Rogers (7 April 1897 – 28 July 1967) was an English cricketer. A right-handed batsman, he played for Gloucestershire County Cricket Club between 1924 and 1931 and also represented the Egypt national cricket team.

== Biography ==
Born in Bristol in 1897, Francis Rogers first played for Gloucestershire in the 1924 English cricket season, making his debut against Yorkshire. He played in 22 County Championship matches that season, also playing for Gloucestershire in a non first-class match against Scotland and in first-class matches against Oxford University and the touring South African national side. He also played against South Africa for the Combined Services cricket team and played for the British Army cricket team against the Royal Navy at Lord's.

The 1924 season was his only full season in county cricket and made up more than half of his first-class career. The remainder of his cricket career was spent in Egypt and India as well as his home country.

In December 1924 he played first-class cricket in India for the first time, playing for the Europeans in the Bombay Quadrangular. He returned to play in England during the 1927 season, playing for the Army in first-class matches against Oxford University and Cambridge University. He returned for a final County Championship match for Gloucestershire against Kent in 1928. In the 1929 season he played for the Army against the RAF and for the Marylebone Cricket Club (MCC) against Oxford University.

He played for Egypt twice in 1931 and once in 1932, all three matches coming against HM Martineau's XI. He also played for the Gezira Sporting Club against Martineau's team. In between his matches for Egypt he made one final appearance for Gloucestershire, against Oxford University during the 1931 English cricket season. This was his last first-class match in England.

The remainder of his first-class career was spent in India. He played for the Europeans in the Madras Presidency Matches of 1933 and 1934. He played three matches against the touring MCC team of 1933/34, two first-class matches for a Viceroy's XI and for Madras and a non-first-class match for Mysore. The match for Madras was his final first-class appearance. He died in Dorchester in 1967.

== Cricket statistics ==
In his 37 first-class matches, Francis Rogers scored 1309 runs at an average of 22.18. He made one century, an innings of 154 made for the Army against the Royal Navy in 1924.
