= Robert Melsome =

English cricketer and British Army officer (1906–1991)

Personal information
- Full name: Robert George William Melsome
- Born: 16 January 1906; Christchurch, Hampshire, England
- Died: 3 November 1991 (aged 85); South Harting, Sussex, England
- Batting: Right-handed
- Bowling: Right-arm medium
- Role: Bowler

Domestic team information
- Years: Team
- 1925–1934: Gloucestershire
- 1929–1938: Army
- 1931–1937: Combined Services
- FC debut: 8 July 1925 Gloucestershire v Glamorgan
- Last FC: 25 June 1938 Army v Oxford University

Career statistics
Competition	First-class
Matches	28
Runs scored	500
Batting average	13.15
100s/50s	0/1
Top score	60
Balls bowled	2,416
Wickets	45
Bowling average	24.40
5 wickets in innings	3
10 wickets in match	0
Best bowling	8/103
Catches/stumpings	22/–
- Source: CricketArchive, 17 May 2008

Brigadier Robert George William Melsome MBE (16 January 1906 – 3 November 1991) was a senior British Army officer and English cricketer. He saw active service during the Second World War, but spent much of the war as a prisoner of war in Germany.

A right-handed batsman and right-arm medium pace bowler, he played for Gloucestershire County Cricket Club between 1925 and 1934. He also played first-class cricket for the Army and Combined Services in addition to international matches for Egypt and Nigeria.

== Cricket career ==
Robert Melsome made his debut for Gloucestershire in a County Championship match against Glamorgan in July 1925. He played seven more County Championship matches that season, all at home. He played first-class cricket for the Army for the first time in the 1926 season, playing against Oxford University, Cambridge University and the Royal Navy. He also played a County Championship match against Hampshire and against Australia for Gloucestershire.

His cricket career took on a somewhat international dimension over the following few years. In April 1927 he played twice for the Free Foresters against Egypt, once in Cairo and once in Alexandria. In May 1928 he played for Shanghai against Hong Kong and in 1931 played for the Gezira Sporting Club against HM Martineau's XI.

Back in England during the 1931 season, he played first-class cricket for the Combined Services against New Zealand and for the Army against the Marylebone Cricket Club (MCC). He returned to Egypt the following year, playing twice for their national side against HM Martineau's XI.

He played five times for Gloucestershire during the 1933 English cricket season, four County Championship matches and a match against Oxford University. He also played a first-class match for the Army against the West Indies.

His final match for Gloucestershire was a County Championship match against Sussex during the 1934 season, but he continued to play representative cricket for the Army, playing a first-class match against Cambridge University every year between 1935 and 1938, also playing non-first-class matches against Australia in 1934 and 1938 and against the West Indies in 1939.

In 1937 he played a first-class match for the Combined Services against New Zealand and his final first-class match came the next year when he played for the Army against Oxford University. He later played for the Nigerian national side against Gold Coast in April 1949.

== Army career ==
After passing out from the Royal Military College, Sandhurst, Melsome was commissioned into the Northamptonshire Regiment as a second lieutenant on 4 February 1926 and was promoted to lieutenant exactly three years later. On 30 January 1936 he was seconded to command a Cadet Company at Sandhurst. He was promoted to captain on 7 July 1937, remaining at Sandhurst.

He continued his service into the Second World War, but was captured early in the war, on 28 May 1940, during the Battle of France and spent most of the war in German prisoner of war camps. Despite his capture, he was promoted major on 4 February 1943. After the war he was appointed a Member of the Order of the British Empire (MBE) on 14 November 1946 for his actions as a POW, the recommendation for the award describes how he was held at Oflag VI-B and Oflag VII-B where he worked on the escape committee and other organisations set up by the POWs, and between October 1942 and February 1945 he managed to establish contact with the War Office and transmit various pieces of useful secret information. His work was also highly commended by Major General Sir Victor Fortune and other senior officers.

Melsome was promoted lieutenant-colonel on 6 January 1948, and employed in that rank until 6 January 1951. He was promoted colonel on 7 February 1952, and to the substantive rank of brigadier (having previously held the rank on a temporary basis) on 12 September 1957. He retired on 1 March 1961.
