= Cyril Walters =

English cricketer

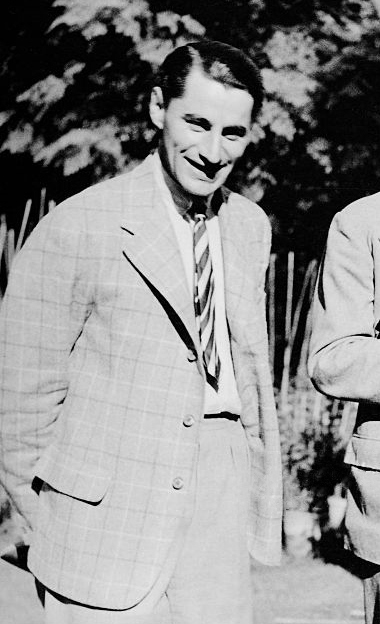
- Walters in India in 1933

Personal information
- Born: 28 August 1905; Bedlinog, Glamorgan, Wales
- Died: 23 December 1992 (aged 87); Neath, Wales
- Batting: Right-handed

International information
- National side: England
- Test debut: 24 June 1933 v West Indies
- Last Test: 22 August 1934 v Australia

Career statistics
| Competition | Test | First-class |
|---|---|---|
| Matches | 11 | 245 |
| Runs scored | 784 | 12,145 |
| Batting average | 52.26 | 30.74 |
| 100s/50s | 1/7 | 21/55 |
| Top score | 102 | 226 |
| Balls bowled | – | 424 |
| Wickets | – | 5 |
| Bowling average | – | 76.00 |
| 5 wickets in innings | – | 0 |
| 10 wickets in match | – | 0 |
| Best bowling | – | 2/22 |
| Catches/stumpings | 6/– | 102/– |
- Source: CricInfo, 30 December 2021

Cyril Frederick Walters (28 August 1905 – 23 December 1992) was a Welsh first-class cricketer who had most of his success after leaving Glamorgan to do duty as captain-secretary of Worcestershire. In this role he developed his batting to such an extent that for a brief period he became an England regular and even captained them in one match as a deputy for Bob Wyatt. However, he unexpectedly completely gave up cricket soon after that, to the dismay of his country and county.

Before he moved to business and Worcestershire, Walters also played rugby union as a winger for Swansea in 1926–27.

== Biography ==
Walters was born Bedlinog, Glamorgan, Wales. Educated at Neath Grammar School, he first played for Glamorgan as a seventeen-year-old in 1923, when his youth meant was only allowed into The Oval after Johnny Clay was summoned from Glamorgan's dressing room. Although he only made one score of over fifty in three full seasons, Glamorgan's batting was so bad that he remained in the eleven, especially with his energetic fielding. In 1926, his business as a surveyor and architect kept him out of the team in the first half of the season. However, he batted successfully for Neath in South Wales league cricket on Saturdays, averaging over 40 for six times out with one unbeaten century. Upon returning he improved phenomenally with 116 in his first match against Warwickshire and 114 against Leicestershire. These innings showed him as a classically graceful batsman with many strokes and led to him being seen as an England prospect.

=== Shift to Worcestershire ===
However, in 1927 business and related studies prevented Walters playing after the first week of June. He again batted successfully for Neath in June and July, but in August Worcestershire, interested in having a permanent secretary, began to see in him an ideal candidate, especially given that he was clearly unable to continue with three-day cricket in Wales. He accepted the position of secretary to Worcestershire in December 1927.

Walters began a period of qualification for Worcestershire, although he played without success in a few matches for his old county in 1928. Though his sole first-class match in 1929 was for Wales against the MCC, when qualified in 1930 Walters' batting helped Worcestershire rise from perennial wooden-spooners to a respectable position.

With Worcestershire Walters modified his style from a wristy, fundamentally off-side based player into one who with his sharp eyes and excellent balance was equally effective on the leg-side. Having frequently led the team in 1930, Walters became captain of Worcestershire for 1931, and advanced steadily despite his team falling off and two very wet summers, scoring over 1,500 runs in 1932 including 190 against Warwickshire.

=== England Batsman ===
However, it was not until 1933 that Walters entered the front rank of batsmen. Whereas he had hit only one century in each of his first three seasons at Worcestershire, that year he hit a county-record nine centuries. With the Nawab of Pataudi, Maurice Nichol and Harold Gibbons, Walters gave Worcestershire a quartet of batsmen who contributed twenty-five centuries between them. Although Worcestershire won only two games because of deplorable bowling through having lost Fred Root after 1932, with Herbert Sutcliffe suffering a surprise decline, Walters was chosen to open the batting in all three Tests against the touring West Indians. With scores of 51 and 46 in the first two Tests he did not disappoint, and was named a Cricketer of the Year by Wisden for 1934. In the following series in India Walters definitely established himself as England's first choice opening bat, averaging 71 for six innings. Although unsuccessful captaining England at Trent Bridge in 1934, Walters went from strength to strength as a batsman, scoring 2,000 runs for the second successive season, with over 400 in the five Tests.

=== Illness, Marriage and End of Career ===
1935 started well, but after a month Walters broke down in health and was advised to take a long rest. However, 271 runs in two matches on returning had him selected for the last Test at Kennington Oval but he had to withdraw as his health broke down again. Overall, he had a remarkable record in Test cricket of having reached 40 in twelve of his eighteen innings.

At the end of 1935 Walters resigned as secretary and captain of Worcestershire, but said he still hoped to play for the county as often as possible. However, as it turned out, his career was already over as he concentrated on his marriage. Even when Walters did not appear in first-class cricket in 1936, Worcestershire believed he would play regularly in 1937 and complement a bowling attack that in a few years had gone from woeful to excellent. However, he did not play at all, and by the end of that season Worcestershire finally knew he would not be seen in the cricket field again. He had "married well" and his wife's private income may have played a part in his not playing again. He was a sham amateur in the days of gentlemen and players.

On Peggy's death in 1974 he returned to Neath, where he died. In later life Walters had difficulty watching cricket because he believed its appeal could distract him from his business duties. He did nevertheless serves as the first president of the Worcestershire Old Players Association in the years preceding his death.

Sporting positions
| Preceded by John Coventry | Worcestershire County Cricket Captain; 1931–1935 | Succeeded by Charles Lyttelton |
