= Rowland Musson =

English cricketer and pilot

Personal information
- Full name: Rowland Gascoigne Musson
- Born: 7 February 1912; Clitheroe, Lancashire, England
- Died: 24 August 1943 (aged 31); Clovelly, Devon, England
- Role: Batsman

Domestic team information
- Years: Team
- 1937: Combined Services
- Only FC: 18 August 1937 Combined Services v New Zealand
- Source: CricketArchive, 1 June 2008

Wing commander Rowland Gascoigne Musson (7 February 1912 – 24 August 1943) was an English cricketer and pilot. He played Lancashire League cricket for East Lancashire and first-class cricket for the Combined Services.

== Biography ==
Born in Clitheroe in 1912, Rowland Musson was educated at Tonbridge School, where he was in the cricket team for three seasons. He was commissioned as an acting pilot in the Royal Air Force in 1933 and spent several years serving in Egypt and the East.

Whilst in Egypt, he played four matches for the Egypt national cricket team against HM Martineau's XI between 1935 and 1936 and made world record flights. Back in England, he played his one first-class match in the 1937 season, representing the Combined Services in a match against New Zealand.

In 1941, he played twice for the Royal Air Force cricket team against the Army, including one match at Lord's. The following year he played for Lancashire in a match against the Army, which they won by four wickets. He was killed in Devon in August 1943 whilst serving with the Coastal Command. His elder brothers Alfred and Francis also played first-class cricket.
