= Ronald Joy =

English cricketer

Personal information
- Full name: Ronald Cecil Graham Joy
- Born: 30 July 1898; Colchester, Essex, England
- Died: 12 December 1974 (aged 76); Ditchingham, Norfolk, England
- Batting: Right-handed
- Bowling: Right-arm fast-medium
- Role: Bowler

Domestic team information
- Years: Team
- 1922–1928: Essex
- 1926–1927: Army
- 1930: Europeans
- 1931: Hyderabad Cricket Association XI
- FC debut: 5 August 1922 Essex v Worcestershire
- Last FC: 4 December 1931 Hyderabad Cricket Association XI v Aligarh University Past and Present

Career statistics
Competition	First-class
Matches	21
Runs scored	315
Batting average	12.60
100s/50s	0/0
Top score	36
Balls bowled	1897
Wickets	41
Bowling average	22.34
5 wickets in innings	1
10 wickets in match	0
Best bowling	5/70
Catches/stumpings	14/–
- Source: CricketArchive, 3 May 2008

Ronald Cecil Graham Joy (30 July 1898 – 12 December 1974) was an English cricketer. A right-handed batsman and right-arm fast-medium bowler, he played for Essex between 1922 and 1928. His father-in-law Frank Penn played Test cricket for England in 1880.

== Biography ==
Born in Colchester in 1898, Ronald Joy made his first-class debut for his native Essex against Worcestershire during the 1922 English cricket season. He did not play first-class cricket the following season, returning for three County Championship matches in 1924 and one match against Gloucestershire.

He didn't play at all for Essex in 1926 and 1927, instead playing first-class cricket for the British Army cricket team. He played against Cambridge University and the Navy in 1926, with those two along with Oxford University making up his opponents in 1927.

He played twice against the touring New Zealand national cricket team in the 1927 season, a first-class match for the Army and a non first-class match for HM Martineau's XI. He returned to Essex for the 1928 season, playing eight County Championship matches.

The remainder of his recorded cricket career was spent overseas. He played twice for Egypt against HM Martineau's XI in 1929, and played in the Madras Presidency Match in India in January 1930.

His last first-class match was for a Hyderabad Cricket Association XI against Aligarh University Past and Present in the semi-final of the Moin-ud-Dowlah Gold Cup Tournament in December 1931. He played twice more for Egypt against HM Martineau's XI in April 1936. He died in Norfolk in 1974.
