= Edward Cawston =

English cricketer (1911–1998)

Personal information
- Born: 16 January 1911; Wantage, Berkshire, England
- Died: 5 September 1998 (aged 87); Maidstone, Kent, England
- Batting: Right-handed
- Bowling: Right-arm medium-fast
- Role: Bowler

Domestic team information
- Years: Team
- 1928–1931: Sussex
- 1932–1933: Cambridge University
- FC debut: 1 August 1928 Sussex v Derbyshire
- Last FC: 5 July 1933 Cambridge University v HDG Leveson-Gower's XI

Career statistics
Competition	First-class
Matches	25
Runs scored	668
Batting average	16.70
100s/50s	0/4
Top score	93
Balls bowled	2,957
Wickets	39
Bowling average	33.46
5 wickets in innings	2
10 wickets in match	0
Best bowling	7/53
Catches/stumpings	16/–
- Source: CricInfo, 7 June 2008

Edward Cawston (16 January 1911 – 5 September 1998) was an English cricketer. A right-handed batsman and right-arm medium-fast bowler, he played first-class cricket for Sussex County Cricket Club and Cambridge University between 1928 and 1933 and also represented the Egypt national cricket team in 1936.

== Personal life ==
Born in Wantage in 1911, Cawston was educated at Lancing College and Cambridge University. After his cricket career, he became headmaster of Orwell Park School. He died in Maidstone in 1998.

== Cricket career ==
Cawston made his first-class debut for Sussex in a County Championship match against Derbyshire in the 1928 English cricket season whilst he was still at school. He played three more County Championship matches over the next two seasons before playing first-class matches for Sussex against Cambridge University in 1930 and 1931, his last two matches for Sussex.

In the 1932 season, his first first-class match for Cambridge University was, perhaps ironically, against Sussex. He played six more first-class matches for the university that season, gaining his blue when he played against Oxford University at Lord's in July. He played twelve first-class matches for the university the following season, including a match against the West Indies, but didn't gain another blue.

His first-class career ended that season with a match for the university against HDG Leveson-Gower's XI, but he continued to play cricket at lower levels. In April 1934 he went on a tour of Egypt with HM Martineau's XI, scoring a century in the first innings of the second match before becoming one of six victims for Eric Cole.

In 1936 he played twice for Egypt against Martineau's team, taking 6/67 in the second innings of the second match. He began playing Minor counties cricket for Berkshire in 1937 and played for them until 1946. He played for the Marylebone Cricket Club (MCC) against Ireland in Dublin in July 1938 and for the RAF against Nottinghamshire in August 1940. He switched counties in 1947, moving to Suffolk, where he finished out his career in 1950.

=== Statistics ===
In his 25 first-class matches Cawston scored 668 runs at an average of 16.70 and took 39 wickets at an average of 33.46. His top score of 93 and his best innings bowling performance of 7/53 were both made in the same match – for Cambridge University against HDG Leveson-Gower's XI in 1932.
