= Harry Rogers (cricketer) =

English cricketer

Harry Oliver Rogers (21 January 1889 – 4 July 1956) was an English first-class cricketer: a left-handed batsman and right-arm medium pace bowler who played for Worcestershire County Cricket Club in the 1920s.

Born in Hednesford, Staffordshire, Rogers made his first-class debut for Worcestershire against Gloucestershire at New Road in June 1923, taking two wickets in the game. He appeared in only one more match that season, taking another two wickets, but played a bigger part in the county's 1924 season when he played in nine games; however, he finished the year with only five wickets and 37 runs from those nine appearances.

1925 was a much more productive year for Rogers, who claimed 68 wickets at an average of 23.11, including four five-wicket innings hauls. The best of these, and indeed the best innings return of his career, was 8–85 against an extremely strong Yorkshire side who were to win their fourth County Championship title in as many years that season. Rogers' efforts were in vain as Worcestershire were bundled out for 65 in their second innings (Macaulay 7-20) to lose by an innings. 1925 also saw his best batting performances, including his only century: he scored 118 not out from number three in the order against Sussex at Amblecote. The second-highest score in Rogers' career was just 50 not out, made against Northamptonshire that same summer.

Rogers never recaptured the heights of 1925, and although he still chipped in with useful wickets (such as his 5–54 against Yorkshire in 1927) he never again took more than 33 wickets in a season. He played a solitary first-class match for Worcestershire against Kent in 1928, conceding 51 runs from ten barren overs, and that was that. He died in Worcester at the age of 67.
