= Eric Cole (British Army officer) =

British Army general and English cricketer (1906–1992)

Major-General Eric Cole CB CBE
- Born: 10 February 1906; Malta
- Died: 19 December 1992 (aged 86); Wandsworth, London, England
- Military career
- Allegiance: United Kingdom
- Branch: British Army
- Service years: 1925–1961
- Rank: Major-General
- Service number: 33651
- Unit: Royal Corps of Signals
- Conflicts: Arab revolt in Palestine; Second World War
- Awards: Companion of the Order of the Bath (CB), 1960; Commander of the Order of the British Empire (CBE), 1945; Mentioned in dispatches, 1940
- Other work: Radio manufacture

Major-General Eric Stuart Cole, CB, CBE (10 February 1906 – 19 December 1992) was a senior British Army officer and telecommunications expert. He saw active service in the Second World War, with his most important contribution being the planning of communications for the invasion of Normandy. He continued his army career after the war, ultimately holding the post of director of telecommunications at the War Office.

He was also a cricketer of county-standard, who played for Kent County Cricket Club during the 1938 English cricket season. A right-handed batsman and right-arm medium pace bowler, he played ten first-class matches in all, and also represented Egypt.

== Personal life and army career ==
Born in Malta in 1906, where his father was then stationed as bandmaster of the Royal Sussex Regiment, Cole was educated at Dover Grammar School for Boys and Royal Military Academy Sandhurst. On graduation from Sandhurst in 1925, he was commissioned as a second lieutenant in the Royal Signal Corps on 3 September, and posted to Egypt, his early career also included time in Palestine, before being promoted to lieutenant on 3 September 1927.

During these first postings he joined a group exploring the deserts of the Middle East. In 1934 he designed a transceiver that enabled an expedition consisting of two cars taking a 1500-mile trip across the Western Desert and Libyan Sand Sea to remain in daily contact with their base at Abbassia. The techniques developed during this and similar expeditions would later be taken up by British Forces in the North African campaign, particularly by the Long Range Desert Group (LRDG), and helped to give them an edge over their Axis counterparts.

He took and passed the examinations for promotion to captain in October 1934, but was not actually promoted until 3 September 1936. In 1938 he was Major-General Bernard Montgomery's chief signal officer in the 8th Division Signals, operating against Arab terrorists in northern Palestine during the Arab revolt in Palestine.

On 1 March 1939, he was appointed adjutant of 1st Infantry Division's Signals. The unit was part of the British Expeditionary Force (BEF) sent to France on the outbreak of the Second World War. Shortly before the main German offensive he became acting deputy chief signal officer to I Corps (and an acting major). During the evacuation from Dunkirk he commanded the signals party which remained with the Corps HQ until it was finally evacuated, managing to keep communications open most of the time, despite only having one wireless detachment, five despatch riders and two linemen; he was wounded on the evacuation beach. The Corps chief signal officer recommended him for a decoration, initially the Military Cross, which was then downgraded to an MBE, but in the end Cole only received a Mention in dispatches.

On Cole's return to the United Kingdom he was soon involved in planning the communications for various amphibious operations proposed by Churchill, mostly cancelled before they got off the drawing board. In July 1941 he was appointed chief signal officer for Force 110, an amphibious force intended to carry out raids and landings across an area from the Azores to Sicily, and designed some of the special comms equipment used by the amphibious and airborne forces. He married an artist, Doris Hartley, in 1941. Given this experience of amphibious operations, he was an obvious choice for the new Combined Operations department when it was set up in January 1942. He was promoted major on 3 September 1942. In this capacity he was involved in planning the communications for the proposed invasion of Normandy. He took part in the invasion as chief signals officer of I Corps, and was sent forward on D+7 to take over signals in 6th Airborne Division, and stayed with that division during the remainder of the Battle of Normandy. On 28 September 1944, he moved to the role of deputy chief signals officer (British) at Allied Forces Headquarters, initially under the command of Field Marshal Sir Henry Maitland Wilson, and, from December 1944 onwards, Field Marshal Sir Harold Alexander. He was appointed a Commander of the Order of the British Empire (CBE) in 1945 for services during the Italian campaign. By this time he held the war substantive rank of lieutenant-colonel, a temporary colonelcy and was an acting brigadier. In April 1945 he was posted to Athens as part of the British Land Forces Greece, supporting Greek Government forces during the Greek Civil War.

In 1946 Cole was appointed chairman of the Joint Communications Board, and his wartime substantive rank of lieutenant-colonel was confirmed. He was promoted substantive colonel in 1948 (with seniority backdated to 1947), and spent two years in Washington, D.C. Further important positions followed, along with promotion to substantive brigadier in 1954. By January 1958 he was at Supreme Headquarters Allied Powers Europe as deputy chief signal officer, and became director of telecommunications at the War Office (with the temporary rank of major-general) on 15 April 1958, receiving substantive promotion on 24 August 1958, and relinquished the role on 27 April 1961, retiring from active duty shortly after. He was appointed Companion of the Order of the Bath (CB) in the 1960 Queen's Birthday Honours, Colonel Commandant of the Royal Corps of Signals on 22 December 1962, in succession to Mervyn Wheatley, and held that appointment until 22 December 1967.

On his retirement in 1961 he joined Ultra Electronics managing their telecommunications business, he was also appointed president of the Radio Society of Great Britain. In 1964 he moved to manage Granger Associates, a radio aerial manufacturer, and later become a director of the company.

== Cricket career ==
Eric Cole
Cricket information
- Batting: Right-handed
- Bowling: Right-arm medium
- Role: Bowler

Domestic team information
- Years: Team
- 1931: Free Foresters
- 1933–1938: Army
- 1937: Combined Services
- 1938: Kent
- FC debut: 13 June 1931 Free Foresters v Cambridge University
- Last FC: 15 June 1938 Kent v Worcestershire

Career statistics
Competition	First-class
Matches	10
Runs scored	147
Batting average	9.80
100s/50s	0/0
Top score	36
Balls bowled	1,757
Wickets	25
Bowling average	36.48
5 wickets in innings	0
10 wickets in match	0
Best bowling	4/78
Catches/stumpings	13/–
- Source: CricInfo, 11 May 2008

Cole's early cricket career was split between Egypt and England. He first played for the Egyptian national team in April 1930, playing twice against HM Martineau's XI. Indeed, all his matches for Egypt were against Martineau's team, which toured the country annually. He also played twice against them for Gezira Sporting Club.

In 1931, after playing twice for Egypt in April, he made his first-class debut, playing for the Free Foresters against Cambridge University. Back in Egypt, he played for the national team once in 1932 and twice in 1933.

The 1933 English cricket season was when he first became involved with Kent County Cricket Club, playing five times for their second XI in the Minor Counties Cricket Championship that year. He also played his second first-class match that year, playing for the British Army cricket team against the West Indies. He again played twice for Egypt in 1934, and played his final match for them in April 1935.

The rest of his cricket career was in England, and in 1935 he played a first-class match for the Army against Cambridge University, and a Minor Counties Championship match for Kent Second XI against Staffordshire. He played first-class matches for the Army against Cambridge University in the 1936 season and against Oxford University in the 1937 season. He also played for the Combined Services against New Zealand in 1937.

In 1938, after playing for the Army against Cambridge University, he made his debut for the Kent first team, playing County Championship matches against Lancashire, Derbyshire and Worcestershire. These were his only games for Kent. He played a minor match for the Army against the West Indies in 1939, his last recorded match.

In total Cole played in ten first-class matches, scoring 147 runs with highest score of 36. He was primarily a bowler, and took 25 first-class wickets with what his Wisden obituary called "highly effective medium-fast out-swingers". His best bowling figures of four wickets for the cost of 78 runs (4/78) were taken on his County Championship debut for Kent against Lancashire at Old Trafford cricket ground.

== Other sports and recreations ==
In his youth, Cole was Army light-heavyweight boxing champion, and also fought at middle-weight. He also represented Aldershot Command in at least one football match in 1928. He later took up golf to a reasonable standard and was president of the Army Golfing Society in the 1970s.

He was a keen photographer, and an associate of the Royal Photographic Society. He collected English bronze coinage, and was known as a numismatist. He frequently competed in amateur radio competitions.

== Bibliography ==
- Carlaw, Derek (2020). Kent County Cricketers, A to Z: Part Two (1919–1939) (PDF). Cardiff: ACS.
