= Philip Pank =

Indian-born English cricketer

Personal information
- Full name: Philip Esmond Durrell Pank
- Born: 22 April 1892; Jaypore, Rajasthan, British India
- Died: 15 February 1966 (aged 73); Colchester, Essex, England
- Bowling: Left-arm orthodox spin
- Role: Bowler

Domestic team information
- Years: Team
- 1918/19: Europeans
- 1918/19: England XI
- 1925: Army
- FC debut: 9 September 1918 Europeans v Hindus
- Last FC: 3 June 1925 Army v Oxford University

Career statistics
Competition	First-class
Matches	4
Runs scored	79
Batting average	13.16
100s/50s	0/0
Top score	29
Balls bowled	217
Wickets	9
Bowling average	12.55
5 wickets in innings	1
10 wickets in match	0
Best bowling	7/12
Catches/stumpings	3/–
- Source: CricketArchive, 26 April 2008

Philip Esmond Durrell Pank (22 April 1892 – 15 February 1966) was an Indian born English cricketer. A left-arm orthodox spin bowler, he played first-class cricket in India in 1918 and in England in 1925 and played four times for the Egypt national cricket team.

== Biography ==
Born in Jaypore in 1892, Philip Pank made his first-class debut playing for the Europeans in the Bombay Quadrangular tournament in September 1918. He played a match for England against India later in the year.

He played one first-class match during the 1925 English cricket season, playing for the British Army cricket team against Oxford University in June. He later played for Egypt, playing twice against the Free Foresters in 1927 and twice against HM Martineau's XI in 1931. He died in Colchester in 1966.
