= Albert Geary =

Jersey cricketer

Personal information
- Full name: Albert Charles Taylor Geary
- Born: 11 September 1900; East Croydon, Surrey, England
- Died: 23 January 1989 (aged 88); Saint Peter, Jersey
- Batting: Right-handed
- Bowling: Right-arm medium-fast

Domestic team information
- Years: Team
- 1922–1931: Surrey

Career statistics
Competition	First-class
Matches	90
Runs scored	670
Batting average	10.63
100s/50s	–/–
Top score	40
Balls bowled	16,163
Wickets	198
Bowling average	30.64
5 wickets in innings	6
10 wickets in match	1
Best bowling	6/50
Catches/stumpings	33/–
- Source: Cricinfo, 14 August 2011

Albert Charles Taylor Geary (11 September 1900 – 23 January 1989) was an English cricketer. Geary was a right-handed batsman who bowled right-arm medium-fast. He was born in East Croydon, London.

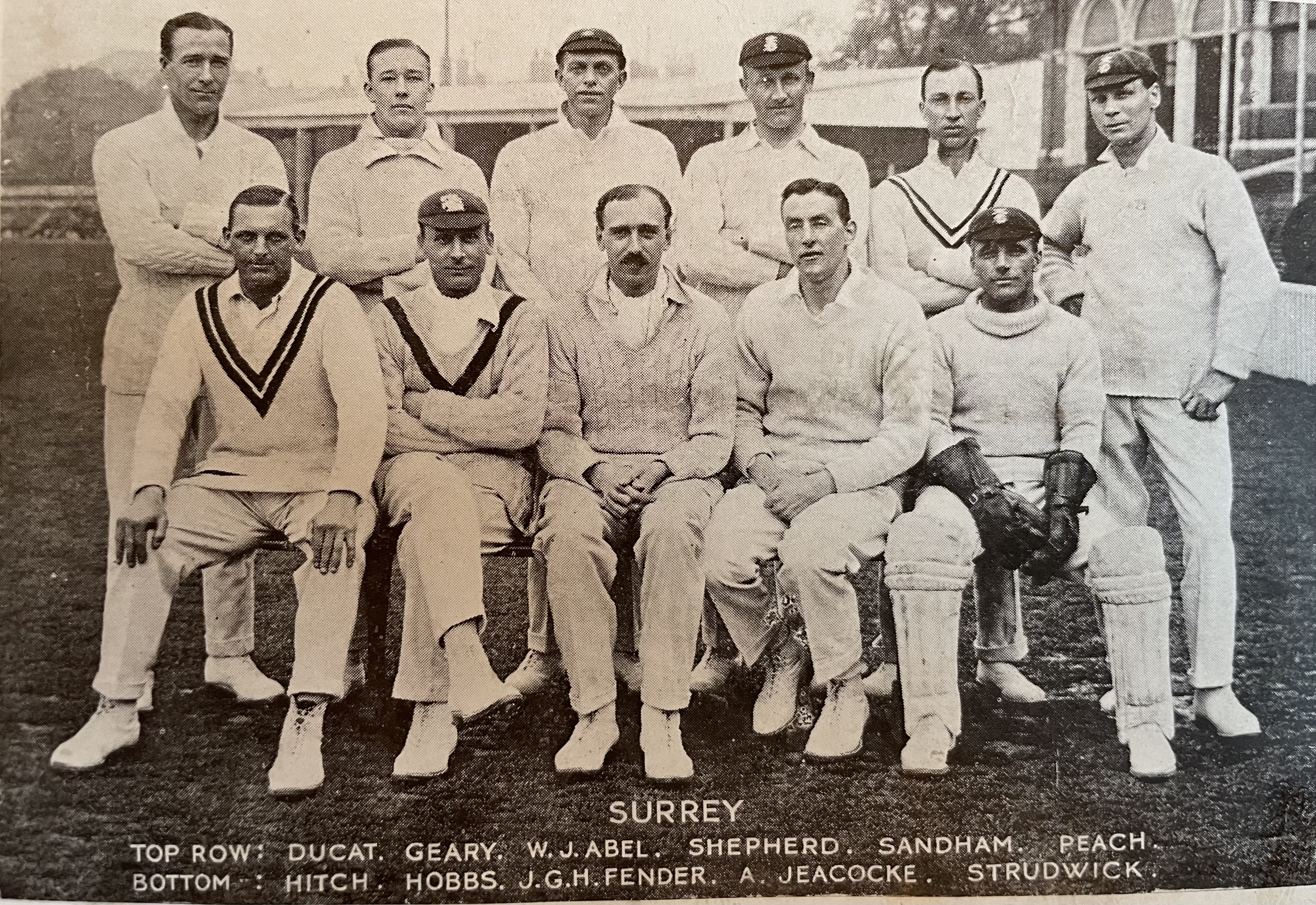
Surrey Cricket Team c1922

Having played for the Surrey Second XI since 1921 in the Minor Counties Championship, he made his first-class debut for Surrey against Somerset in the 1922 County Championship. It wouldn't be until the 1925 season that he became more of a regular starter in the Surrey XI. By the time he played his final first-class match against Lancashire in the 1931 County Championship, he had made 90 first-class appearances. Geary's role within the team was as a bowler, in his 90 first-class matches he took 198 wickets at an average of 30.64, with best figures of 6/50. These figures, one of six five-wicket hauls he took in his career, came against Hampshire in the 1927 County Championship, a season in which he took 79 wickets at an average of 25.15, making it the most successful season of his career. A lower-order batsman, Geary scored 670 runs at a batting average of 10.63, with a high score of 40. His time at Surrey was characterised by him making nearly as many appearances for the Second XI in the Minor Counties Championship as he did for the First XI. With the batsman-friendly pitches at The Oval not helping his bowling, and with him being all too often overlooked by the Surrey selectors, he left the county at the end of the 1931 season. While playing for Surrey, he stood as an umpire in a first-class match between the Royal Navy and the Royal Air Force.

He soon after moved to Jersey, playing a single match for the Jersey cricket team against the Marylebone Cricket Club in 1934. The match was a success for Geary, with him taking a total of 8 wickets in it, as well as scoring a century in Jersey's first-innings. The match though was not rated as first-class. Geary would go on to take 437 wickets against touring teams in eight seasons for the island. He lived out the remainder of his life on Jersey, with him dying in Saint Peter on 21 January 1989.
