= Harold Hinde =

English cricketer and British Army officer (1895–1965)

Harold Montague Hinde
- Born: 24 August 1895; Southsea, Hampshire, England
- Died: 16 November 1965 (aged 70); Santa Margherita Ligure, Italy
- Military career
- Allegiance: United Kingdom
- Branch: British Army
- Service years: 1914–1950
- Rank: Brigadier
- Service number: 8457
- Unit: Royal Army Service Corps
- Conflicts: World War I World War II
- Awards: Order of the Bath; Order of the British Empire; Order of the Oak Crown (Luxembourg)

Harold Hinde
Cricket information
- Batting: Right-handed
- Bowling: Right-arm fast
- Role: Bowler

Domestic team information
- Years: Team
- 1924: Minor Counties
- Only FC: 28 June 1924 Minor Counties v HDG Leveson Gower's XI

Career statistics
Competition	First-class
Matches	1
Runs scored	0
Batting average	0.00
100s/50s	0/0
Top score	0*
Balls bowled	228
Wickets	9
Bowling average	15.33
5 wickets in innings	1
10 wickets in match	0
Best bowling	8/77
Catches/stumpings	0/–
- Source: CricketArchive, 26 April 2008

Brigadier Harold Montague Hinde CB CBE (24 August 1895 – 16 November 1965) was an officer of the British Army and cricketer.

== Biography ==
Born in Southsea, Hinde was educated at Wellington and Blundell's Schools, and was a "Gentlemen Cadet" at the Royal Military College, before receiving his commission as a second lieutenant in the Royal Army Service Corps on 15 August 1914, within two weeks of the start of World War I. He was appointed temporary lieutenant on 1 May 1915, and temporary captain on 1 February 1916, receiving promotion to the permanent rank of lieutenant on 23 February 1916, and being appointed adjutant on 8 February 1918. On 3 June 1919, in recognition of his "valuable services rendered in connection with military operations in France and Flanders", Hinde was made an Officer of the Order of the British Empire (OBE).

Hinde was appointed adjutant for the second time on 2 April 1933. On 1 November 1935 he was promoted to the temporary rank of major while "specially employed", receiving promotion to the rank of major in December, backdated to 25 October.

During World War II, on 23 June 1941, Hinde was promoted to lieutenant-colonel. On 5 August 1943, now a temporary brigadier, he was made a Commander of the Order of the British Empire (CBE). On 23 June 1944, having completed his tenure as regimental lieutenant-colonel, he remained on full pay as a supernumerary. On 30 June 1944, he was promoted to colonel, with seniority from 26 February 1944. In July 1945, following the end of the war in Europe, Hinde received two mentions in despatches in recognition of his "gallant and distinguished" services in Italy and North West Europe, and in August 1946 he was made a Commander of the Order of the Oak Crown by Charlotte, Grand Duchess of Luxembourg.

On 27 October 1948 Hinde was promoted to brigadier, and was retained on the Active List, as a supernumerary to the establishment. He finally retired from the army on 19 September 1950, and was made a Companion of the Order of the Bath (CB) on 1 January 1951. Hinde remained in the Reserve of Officers until reaching the compulsory age limit on 24 August 1954. He died in Italy in 1965.

=== Cricketing career ===
A right-handed batsman and right-arm fast bowler, Hinde played minor counties cricket for Berkshire between 1921 and 1932, taking 142 wickets. In 1924 he played a single first-class match for the combined Minor Counties team against HDG Leveson Gower's XI at The Saffrons, Eastbourne, and also four times for the Egypt national cricket team, twice against the Free Foresters in 1927 and twice against HM Martineau's XI in 1930. Hinde also played for the Army three times, as well for his Corps and the Gezira Sporting Club.
