= Robert Osborne-Smith =

Cricketer (1908–1972)

Personal information
- Full name: Robert Edward Osborne-Smith
- Born: 18 July 1908; Saint Helier, Jersey
- Died: 13 December 1972 (aged 64); Saint Aubin, Jersey

International information

Domestic team information
- Years: Team
- 1934/35: Indian Army

Career statistics
Competition	First-class
Matches	1
Runs scored	11
Batting average	–
100s/50s	0/0
Top score	10*
Balls bowled	204
Wickets	4
Bowling average	33.50
5 wickets in innings	0
10 wickets in match	0
Best bowling	4/134
Catches/stumpings	0/–
- Source: CricketArchive, 17 January 2011

Brigadier Robert Edward Osborne-Smith DSO OBE (18 July 1908 – 13 December 1972) was a Jersey-born British Army officer and Indian cricketer.

== Cricket career ==
He played one first-class cricket match for the Indian Army against Northern India in the 1934/35 Ranji Trophy. He had earlier played twice for the Egypt national cricket team against HM Martineau's XI, and later played for the British Army cricket team against Australia in 1938.

== Military career ==
Osborne-Smith was commissioned into the British Army in 1929 and in 1944 (as a captain, Temporary Major, Acting Lieutenant-Colonel) was commanding officer of 1st Battalion Worcestershire Regiment in 43rd (Wessex) Division during the Normandy Campaign (Operation Overlord). He distinguished himself in the fighting round Mont Pinçon and the crossing of the River Seine. He was involved in the failed attempt to reach Arnhem during the 1944 Operation Market Garden. In the fighting round Geilenkirchen (Operation Clipper):

1 Worcestershire had threaded their way through the battered village of Gilrath and formed up in a depression in front of it. Lieutenant-Colonel R.E. Osborne Smith, a rifle slung over his shoulder, moved amongst the troops. He had a word and a smile for everyone. Indeed, at no time in the campaign did his normal composure or quiet courtesy to all ranks ever desert him. At 2 p.m. he gave the order to advance.

A few minutes later, Osborne-Smith was severely wounded by a shell splinter in the leg, and he had to be evacuated.

He was awarded a DSO in March 1945 (when his place of residence was given as Tettenhall, Staffordshire) and retired as a Brigadier on 19 July 1960.
