= Joshua Chaytor =

Personal information
- Full name: Joshua David Gerald Chaytor
- Born: 13 May 1903; Knockmaroon, County Dublin, Ireland
- Died: 4 March 1937 (aged 33); Meerut, Uttar Pradesh, India
- Batting: Right-handed
- Bowling: Right-arm fast-medium
- Role: Batsman

Domestic team information
- Years: Team
- 1924: Free Foresters
- Only FC: 11 June 1924 Free Foresters v Cambridge University
- Source: CricketArchive, 24 May 2008

Captain Joshua David Gerald Chaytor (13 May 1903 – 4 March 1937) was an Irish-born cricketer. A right-handed batsman and right-arm fast-medium bowler, he played first-class cricket in the 1924 English cricket season and also represented the Egypt national cricket team.

== Biography ==
Born at Knockmaroon House, County Dublin, Ireland in 1903, he was the son of a stockbroker, Joshua David Chaytor (1862–1908) and his wife Lucy Sophia Norris. Educated at Wellington College, Joshua Chaytor played his one first-class match in June 1924, representing the Free Foresters against Cambridge University. Later in the year he played for the Marylebone Cricket Club (MCC) against his native Ireland.

In April 1933 he played for Egypt against HM Martineau's XI, top-scoring with 41 in the second innings. He died in India in 1937 whilst playing polo.
