= John Walford (cricketer) =

English cricketer

Personal information
- Full name: John Erskine Scott Walford MBE
- Born: 14 August 1899; Hanbury Mount, Worcestershire, England
- Died: 22 August 1961 (aged 62); Hammersmith, London, England
- Batting: Right-handed
- Bowling: Right-arm fast-medium
- Role: Bowler

Domestic team information
- Years: Team
- 1930–1932: Army
- 1923–1930: Worcestershire
- First-class debut: 7 July 1923 Worcestershire v Sussex
- Last First-class: 29 June 1932 Army v Royal Air Force

Career statistics
Competition	First-class
Matches	11
Runs scored	198
Batting average	11.00
100s/50s	0/0
Top score	31
Balls bowled	1031
Wickets	29
Bowling average	16.13
5 wickets in innings	2
10 wickets in match	0
Best bowling	6/27
Catches/stumpings	6/0
- Source: CricketArchive, 15 June 2008

John Erskine Scott Walford MBE (14 August 1899 – 22 August 1961) was an English cricketer. A right-handed batsman and right-arm fast-medium bowler, he played 11 first-class matches between 1923 and 1932, six for Worcestershire and five for the British Army cricket team. He also represented the Egypt national cricket team.

== Biography ==
Born in Hanbury Mount, Worcestershire, Walford made his debut for Worcestershire against Sussex in July 1923, although he did not get to bowl and made only 11 and 5 with the bat. Indeed, he played largely as a batsman that season, bowling only half a dozen overs in five matches and gaining no reward. He did however manage what was to remain his highest score when he hit 31 against Northamptonshire in his second match.

There then followed six years in which Walford played no first-class cricket, before he returned to play for the Army against the RAF at The Oval in July 1930. In the first innings of this match he claimed his first wicket, that of Ronald Sugden, and went on to take five more to finish with what would remain his career best of 6–27. (He also took two wickets in the second innings.)

In the next two years, he played four more times for the Army, and consistently took wickets, a notable performance being his 6–31 against the Marylebone Cricket Club (MCC) in August 1931. He also turned out one more time for Worcestershire, against Nottinghamshire in 1930.

His last first-class match was for the Army against the RAF in June 1932, after which he continued to play at lower levels. He played for the MCC against the Netherlands in 1937 and 1939 and against Ireland in 1939. Earlier that year, he played twice for Egypt against HM Martineau's XI. He died at Ravenscourt Park, Hammersmith, London a few days after his 62nd birthday.
