= Jeff Linton =

Welsh cricketer and British Army officer

Personal information
- Full name: James Edward Fryer Linton
- Born: 7 May 1909; Llandaff, Glamorgan, Wales
- Died: 27 December 1989 (aged 80); Cozumel Island, Mexico
- Batting: Right-handed
- Bowling: Right-arm medium-fast

Domestic team information
- Years: Team
- 1932: Glamorgan
- FC debut: 17 August 1932 Glamorgan v Middlesex
- Last FC: 20 August 1932 Glamorgan v Hampshire

Career statistics
| Competition | First-class |
|---|---|
| Matches | 2 |
| Runs scored | 3 |
| Batting average | 0.75 |
| 100s/50s | 0/0 |
| Top score | 2 |
| Balls bowled | 150 |
| Wickets | 1 |
| Bowling average | 82.00 |
| 5 wickets in innings | 0 |
| 10 wickets in match | 0 |
| Best bowling | 1/34 |
| Catches/stumpings | 0/– |
- Source: CricketArchive, 8 June 2008

Brigadier James Edward Fryer "Jeff" Linton DSO (7 May 1909–27 December 1989) was a Welsh cricketer and British Army officer. He served with the Royal Artillery during World War II after previously playing first-class cricket for Glamorgan County Cricket Club in the 1932 English cricket season as a right-handed batsman and right-arm medium-fast bowler. He also represented the Egypt national cricket team.

== Biography ==
Born in Llandaff in 1909, Linton was educated at Charterhouse School where he captained the cricket team. He played his only two first-class matches for his native Glamorgan in August 1932 against Middlesex and Hampshire. In April 1938 he played twice for Egypt against HM Martineau's XI.

He served with the Royal Artillery during World War II, and was awarded the Distinguished Service Order in 1944 after escaping from a prisoner-of-war camp. He had a distinguished military career, and after the war was elevated to the rank of Brigadier and became a senior instructor in anti-tank warfare at the School of Artillery. He died in Mexico in 1989.
