= Godfrey Firbank =

English cricketer

Personal information
- Full name: Godfrey Christopher Firbank
- Born: 19 June 1895; Wrington, Somerset, England
- Died: 8 July 1947 (aged 52); King's Somborne, Hampshire, England
- Bowling: Left-arm orthodox spin
- Role: Bowler

Domestic team information
- Years: Team
- 1922: Combined Services
- 1927: Army
- FC debut: 10 May 1922 Combined Services v Essex
- Last FC: 16 July 1927 Army v Royal Navy

Career statistics
Competition	First-class
Matches	2
Runs scored	0
Batting average	0.00
100s/50s	0/0
Top score	0*
Balls bowled	372
Wickets	5
Bowling average	35.40
5 wickets in innings	0
10 wickets in match	0
Best bowling	3/67
Catches/stumpings	0/–
- Source: CricketArchive, 10 May 2008

Lieutenant-Colonel Godfrey Christopher Firbank MC (19 June 1895 – 8 July 1947) was an English cricketer. A left-arm orthodox spin bowler, he played first-class cricket for the Army and for the Combined Services in addition to international matches for Egypt.

Born in Somerset in 1895, Firbank served in the Gloucestershire Regiment and then (from 1917) the Coldstream Guards during the First World War, reaching the rank of lieutenant and receiving the Military Cross. He was promoted captain in 1924 and major in 1939. He retired as a lieutenant-colonel in 1945.

Godfrey Firbank made his first-class debut in May 1922, playing for the Combined Services against Essex. He also played for the Household Brigade team against Eton College the same month.

After playing for I Zingari against the Royal Engineers in July 1925 he went on a tour of Egypt in April 1925 with the Free Foresters, playing two matches against the Egyptian national side. Back in England, he played for the Army against the Royal Navy at Lord's that summer, his last first-class match.

He later returned to Egypt, this time playing for the national side in three matches against HM Martineau's XI between 1929 and 1930. He died in Hampshire in 1947, aged 52.
