= James Leaf =

English cricketer and British Army officer (1900–1972)

Personal information
- Full name: James Gordon Leaf
- Born: 18 October 1900; Shipston-on-Stour, Warwickshire, England
- Died: 8 December 1972 (aged 72); Osmaston, Derbyshire, England

Domestic team information
- Years: Team
- 1937: Army
- Only FC: 22 May 1937 Army v Oxford University

Career statistics
Competition	First-class
Matches	1
Runs scored	5
Batting average	2.50
100s/50s	0/0
Top score	4
Catches/stumpings	0/–
- Source: CricketArchive, 26 April 2008

James Gordon Leaf (18 October 1900 – 8 December 1972) was a British Army officer and English cricketer who played first-class cricket for the British Army cricket team and played international matches for the Egypt national cricket team.

== Biography ==
Born in Shipston-on-Stour in 1900, James Leaf attended Harrow School, playing a match for them against Winchester College in 1918. From Harrow he went to the Royal Military College, Sandhurst, and on graduation was commissioned as a second lieutenant into the 15th Hussars on 24 December 1920. The regiment merged with the 20th Hussars in 1922, Leaf continued as a second lieutenant in the new regiment, the 14th/20th Hussars, until his promotion to lieutenant on 24 December 1922 when he transferred to the 15th/19th Hussars. He played two matches for Egypt against the Free Foresters in 1927. He resigned his commission on 20 October 1928, but rejoined the army (and the 15th/19th) on 10 December 1930, with reduced seniority (from 29 August 1926). He was promoted captain on 20 November 1934.

He played his one first-class match for the Army against Oxford University in May 1937. He was promoted major on 12 February 1940, shortly after the outbreak of the Second World War. Between 1942 and 1945, he played six matches for the Catterick Garrison cricket team against Durham. He retired from the army on 18 October 1947. He died in Osmaston in 1972.
