= Alfred Musson =

British Army General and Cricketer

Major-General Alfred Musson CB CBE
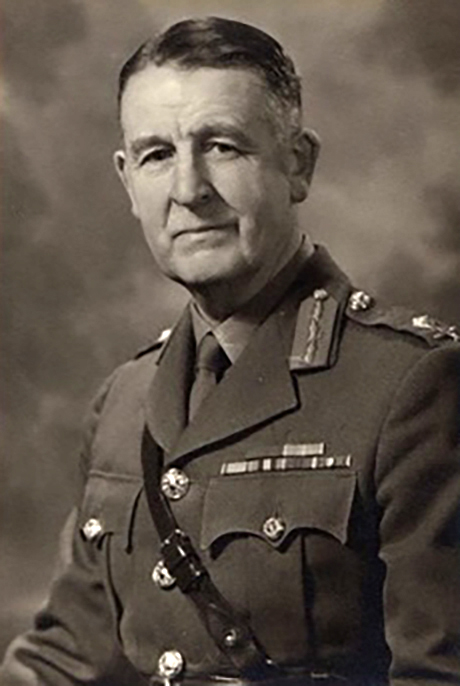
- Musson in c. 1957
- Born: Alfred Henry Musson; 14 August 1900; Clitheroe, Lancashire, England
- Died: 6 August 1995 (aged 94); Pembury, Kent, England
- Cricket career

Cricket information
- Batting: Right-handed
- Bowling: Right-arm medium

Domestic team information
- Years: Team
- 1925: Army
- Only FC: 30 May 1925 Army v Cambridge University
- Source: CricketArchive, 1 June 2008

Major-General Alfred Henry Musson, CB, CBE (14 August 1900 – 6 August 1995) was a senior British Army officer and an English cricketer.

== Military career ==
Alfred Musson was an officer of the British Army, joining the Royal Artillery in 1918. During World War II, he served as liaison to the US government at Bell Labs in Murry Hill, New Jersey. At Bell Labs, he contributed to the development of advanced artillery fire control systems, for which he was appointed an Officer of the Legion of Merit by the government of the United States. Following World War II, Musson served as Vice President and later President, Ordnance Board for the Ministry of Supply from 1955 until his retirement from the Army in 1958.

Musson was appointed an Officer of the Legion of Merit in 1947, Commander of the Most Excellent Order of the British Empire in 1956, and a Companion of the Order of the Bath in 1958.

== Cricket career ==
Musson was a right-handed batsman and right-arm medium pace bowler. He played a first-class cricket match for the British Army cricket team against Cambridge University during the 1925 English cricket season. Between 1928 and 1931, he played three matches for Hong Kong against Shanghai.
