= Richard More (cricketer) =

English cricketer (1879–1936)

Personal information
- Full name: Richard Edwardes More
- Born: 3 January 1879; Bishop's Castle, Shropshire, England
- Died: 24 November 1936 (aged 57); Cairo, Egypt
- Batting: Right-handed
- Bowling: Right-arm medium
- Role: All-rounder

Domestic team information
- Years: Team
- 1898–1901: Oxford University
- 1901–1910: Middlesex
- 1901–1904: Gentlemen of England
- 1901: BJT Bosanquet's XI
- 1905: MCC
- 1914: GJV Weigall's XI
- FC debut: 19 May 1898 Oxford University v MCC
- Last FC: 15 June 1914 GJV Weigall's XI v Oxford University

Career statistics
Competition	First-class
Matches	57
Runs scored	1,671
Batting average	20.88
100s/50s	3/6
Top score	133
Balls bowled	7417
Wickets	124
Bowling average	27.67
5 wickets in innings	4
10 wickets in match	2
Best bowling	6/28
Catches/stumpings	38/–
- Source: CricketArchive, 20 April 2008

Richard Edwardes More CMG OBE (3 January 1879 – 24 November 1936) was an English cricketer. A right-handed batsman and right-arm medium pace bowler, he played first-class cricket for Oxford University and Middlesex, amongst others, and later played for the Egypt national cricket team while he was working for the Sudan Civil Service.

== Biography ==
Richard More was a son of Robert Jasper More, a barrister and politician. He was educated at Westminster School, where he captained the cricket and football teams. He then went up to Christ Church, Oxford, and made his first-class debut for the university cricket team against the Marylebone Cricket Club (MCC) during the 1898 English cricket season. He also played a first-class match for the university against Essex that year.

He did not play for the university in 1899 and returned to the side for the 1900 season when he played matches against Surrey, Sussex and the MCC before gaining his blue when playing against Cambridge University at Lord's.

He played eight first-class matches for the university side in 1901 in addition to a non-first-class match against Dublin University in Dublin. He made his debut for Middlesex that year, when he played a County Championship match against Nottinghamshire. He played thirteen further County Championship matches that season, also playing in the Gentlemen v Players match. He then toured North America with a team captained by Bernard Bosanquet, playing two first-class matches against Philadelphia.

After not playing first-class cricket in 1902 or 1903, he returned to the Middlesex team for nine County Championship matches in the 1904 season, also playing for the Gentlemen of England against the Players of the South that year. He played two first-class matches for the MCC in 1905 – against Cambridge University and Oxford University.

He played four County Championship matches for Middlesex during the 1909 season, before his last season in 1910, when he played nine times. In June 1910, he played for the MCC against Belgium and the Netherlands as part of a cricket tournament in Brussels organised as part of the World's Fair that also featured France.

in 1901 More joined the Sudan civil service. He came back to England with a combined Egypt/Sudan team to play the MCC at Lord's in 1914. He also played his final first-class match in 1914, playing for GJV Weigall's XI against Oxford University.

He was Governor of Khartoum Province 1913–20 and Sudan agent in Cairo 1920–31. He played two matches for the Egyptian national side in the 1920s, one against Free Foresters in 1927 and another against HM Martineau's XI in 1929.

After the First World War More's name was submitted by the Governor-General of the Sudan among those "whose work in connection with military operations, and the situation in the Sudan created by the War, is deserving of special notice and commendation" and he was appointed OBE. He was appointed CMG in the 1928 Birthday Honours. He was awarded the fourth class of the Order of Osmanieh in 1913 and the third class of the Order of the Nile in 1917, raised to Grand Cordon in 1931.

== Statistics ==
In his 57 first-class matches, Richard More scored 1671 runs at an average of 20.88, including three centuries. He took 124 wickets at an average of 27.67, taking five wickets in an innings four times and ten wickets in a match twice.

His top score of 133 was made for Oxford University against Surrey in 1901. His best innings bowling performance of 6/28 was for BJT Bosanquet's XI against Philadelphia on his 1901 tour of North America.
