= Oswald Smith-Bingham =

Indian cricketer (1904–1979)

Personal information
- Full name: Oswald Cyril Smith-Bingham
- Born: 29 January 1904; Harrismith, Orange River Colony
- Died: 27 January 1979 (aged 74); Doughton, India

Domestic team information
- Years: Team
- 1933–1934: Viceroy's XI
- FC debut: 21 November 1933 Viceroy's XI v MCC
- Last FC: 23 October 1934 Viceroy's XI v Indian University Occasionals

Career statistics
Competition	First-class
Matches	2
Runs scored	21
Batting average	7.00
100s/50s	0/0
Top score	10*
Catches/stumpings	0/0
- Source: CricketArchive, 17 May 2008

Oswald Cyril Smith-Bingham (29 January 1904 – 27 January 1979) was a cricketer who played for India. He played three times for the Egypt national cricket team against HM Martineau's XI in the early 1930s and later played two first-class matches in India for a Viceroy's XI, including one against the MCC.
