= Thomas Sturgess =

Indian cricketer

Personal information
- Full name: Thomas Moore Sturgess
- Born: 24 September 1898; Assam, British India
- Died: 2 February 1974 (aged 75); Cape Town, Cape Province, South Africa
- Role: Wicket-keeper

Domestic team information
- Years: Team
- 1940–1943: Europeans
- FC debut: 20 December 1940 Europeans v The Rest
- Last FC: 26 November 1943 Europeans v Hindus

Career statistics
Competition	First-class
Matches	2
Runs scored	27
Batting average	6.75
100s/50s	0/0
Top score	18
Catches/stumpings	3/1
- Source: CricketArchive, 4 May 2008

Thomas Moore Sturgess (24 September 1898 – 2 February 1974) was an Indian cricketer. A wicket-keeper, he played first-class cricket in India in the 1940s, having previously represented the Egypt national cricket team.

== Biography ==
Born in Assam in 1898, Thomas Sturgess joined the Royal Flying Corps as a flight cadet in October 1916 and undertook his initial training at Denham and Oxford before being commissioned a Temporary Second Lieutenant on probation on 27 April 1917.

Following further training with No. 3 Reserve Squadron, No. 19 Reserve Squadron, and No. 10 Reserve Squadron in England, he was posted to France as a Flying Officer on 13 June 1917. Sturgess was next posted to his first and only operational unit, 41 Squadron RFC, which was based at Abeele, Belgium on 18 June 1917.

On 24 June 1917, Sturgess was flying F.E.8, A4925, on patrol when a piston rod broke and he force-landed behind German lines northeast of Zandvoorde but crashed on landing, breaking both right planes, though uninjured himself. He was captured by German soldiers and held at Karlsruhe, and repatriated home via Kingston_upon_Hull|Hull on 14 December 1918.

Sturgess emigrated to Egypt in October 1921, and married Doris Frazer in Alexandria in July 1925. Entries on shipping records throughout this period indicate that Sturgess was employed in the insurance industry in Alexandria.

He made his cricket debut for Egypt against HM Martineau's XI in 1929. He played twice more for Egypt against the same opposition in 1931 and 1932, also playing against them for Alexandria Cricket Club in those years.

His first-class career didn't begin until December 1940 when he played in the Bombay Pentangular Tournament for the Europeans at the age of 42. He played in the tournament again three years later. He died in Cape Town in 1974.
