= Ronald Yeldham =

Indian-born British Army officer and cricketer

Personal information
- Full name: Ronald Ernest Stephen Yeldham
- Born: 18 August 1902; Ahmednagar, British India
- Died: 14 August 1983 (aged 80); Bodmin, Cornwall

Domestic team information
- Years: Team
- 1925–1927: Europeans (India)
- 1926: Northern Punjab
- 1926: MCC
- FC debut: 6 March 1925 Europeans v Muslims
- Last FC: 5 December 1927 Europeans v Muslims

Career statistics
Competition	First-class
Matches	6
Runs scored	148
Batting average	21.14
100s/50s	0/0
Top score	40*
Balls bowled	30
Wickets	0
Bowling average	–
5 wickets in innings	–
10 wickets in match	–
Best bowling	–
Catches/stumpings	7/–
- Source: , 8 June 2008

Colonel Ronald Ernest Stephen Yeldham CBE (18 August 1902 – 14 August 1983) was an Indian-born British Army officer and cricketer.

== Career ==
He served in Africa and the Indian Ocean from 1928 to 1945. In June 1945, Yeldham was appointed Commander of the Order of the British Empire (CBE) as temporary Colonel commanding the British troops in Mauritius.

In 1949 Yeldham was a Principal in the Colonial Office, West African Department, and wrote a memorandum (16 March) on Soviet activity in Nigeria. There was MI5 surveillance of Harry Pollitt's contact with Mokwugo Okoye, a Zikist leader (Yeldham, memorandum in December of that year). During the Malayan Emergency, in 1952, he was instrumental in the use of sodium trichloroacetate as a defoliant.

Yeldham then held civil appointments in Kenya, from 1954.

== Cricketer ==
Yeldham played six first-class cricket matches in British India between 1925 and 1927, including one for the MCC. He later played twice for Egypt against HM Martineau's XI.
