= Officers Club Services Ground =

Cricket ground in Aldershot, Hampshire, England

Ground information
- Location: Aldershot, Hampshire
- Coordinates: 51.2603°N 0.7713°W
- Establishment: 1861

International information
- Only WT20I: 27 June 2011: India v New Zealand

Team information
Hampshire	(1905–1948)
Army	(1906–present)
- As of 5 September 2020; Source: Ground profile

The Officers Club Services Ground is a cricket ground in Aldershot, Hampshire, England. The ground was used as a host venue for first-class cricket by Hampshire and various armed services teams from 1905 to 1964, hosting nine matches. A Women's Twenty20 International was played there in 2011.

== History ==
Aldershot had been a small village until 1853, but was transformed following the purchase of 25,000 acres of land by the War Office for military training. Over the following two decades Aldershot was transformed into a garrison town, by 1874 a number of cricket grounds, including the Officers Club Services Ground, had been constructed for use by the various regiments garrisoned there.

The first recorded match to have been played there was in 1861 between the Knickerbockers and I Zingari. Over the coming decade the ground was used by the Aldershot Division in matches primarily against I Zingari and the Marylebone Cricket Club, though not exclusively as some matches were against other parts of the armed forces. A pavilion was built in 1887. Hampshire first played first-class cricket there in the 1905 County Championship against Surrey, with Hampshire losing this match by 7 wickets. Hampshire used the ground twice more as a venue before World War I, playing Surrey in 1906 and Somerset in 1910. This season also saw its first-class use by an armed services team, when a combined Army and Navy team played a combined Oxford and Cambridge Universities team, which marked the final first-class match played there before World War I. First-class cricket did not return immediately after the war, the first match of note came in May 1932 when the Army played the touring Indians in a two-day non-first-class match, which was abandoned without a ball bowled. Later that year in June, first-class cricket returned to the ground when the Army played the touring South Americans, which the Army won by 5 wickets.

The following season, the Army played another first-class match against the touring West Indians, which ended in a draw. Of note was the Army's opening partnership of 286 in their first-innings between Reginald Hudson and Cyril Hamilton. This was the final first-class match held there before World War II, despite visits from the touring Australians in 1934 and 1938, and from the West Indians in 1939, none of which were rated first-class. A new pavilion was constructed to replace the original in 1936 and was opened by General Sir John Francis Gathorne-Hardy.

Minor matches between various armed services teams and the Oxford University Authentics were played during the war. Following the end of the war, Hampshire returned to playing first-class cricket at the ground, playing two matches in 1948 against Cambridge University, which was drawn, and the Combined Services, which Hampshire won by an innings and 60 runs. These matches were the last first-class matches Hampshire would play there. First-class cricket did not return until 1964, when the final first-class held there was played between the Combined Services and Oxford University. Both the Army and the Combined Services continued to play at the ground after this, doing so to this day. More recently, a Women's Twenty20 International was played there in 2011 between India Women and New Zealand Women, which India Women won by 3 wickets.

== Records ==
=== First-class ===
- Highest team total: 482 by Surrey v Hampshire, 1905
- Lowest team total: 99 by Combined Services v Hampshire, 1948
- Highest individual innings: 181 by Reginald Hudson for Army v West Indians, 1933
- Best bowling in an innings: 7-45 by Charlie Llewellyn for Hampshire v Somerset, 1910
- Best bowling in a match: 13-106 by Charlie Llewellyn, as above

== See also ==
- List of Hampshire County Cricket Club grounds
- List of cricket grounds in England and Wales
