= Basil Clarke (cricketer) =

Indian-born English cricketer

Personal information
- Full name: Basil Frederick Clarke
- Born: 26 September 1885; Madras, British India
- Died: 4 May 1940 (aged 54); Hove, Sussex, England
- Batting: Right-handed
- Role: Batsman

Domestic team information
- Years: Team
- 1914–1920: Gloucestershire
- 1919: HDG Leveson-Gower's XI
- 1919–1920: Army
- 1922: Leicestershire
- FC debut: 23 July 1914 Gloucestershire v Nottinghamshire
- Last FC: 8 July 1922 Leicestershire v Hampshire

Career statistics
Competition	First-class
Matches	20
Runs scored	349
Batting average	12.03
100s/50s	1/0
Top score	108*
Balls bowled	18
Wickets	0
Bowling average	–
5 wickets in innings	–
10 wickets in match	–
Best bowling	–
Catches/stumpings	10/–
- Source: CricketArchive, 20 April 2008

Basil Frederick Clarke (26 September 1885 – 4 May 1940) was an English cricketer. A right-handed batsman, he played county cricket for Gloucestershire and Leicestershire and also played twice for the Egypt national cricket team.

== Biography ==
Born in Madras in 1885, Basil Clarke made his first-class debut for Gloucestershire in a County Championship match against Nottinghamshire during the 1914 English cricket season. He played two further county championship matches, against Lancashire and Yorkshire, that season.

His cricket career was interrupted by the First World War, and he returned to first-class cricket for the 1919 season, when he played four County Championship matches for Gloucestershire. He also played first-class matches for Gloucestershire against Worcestershire and the touring Australian Imperial Forces team in addition to a match for the Army against the Royal Navy at Lord's and a match for HDG Leveson-Gower's XI against Oxford University during the season.

He played three County Championship matches for Gloucestershire in 1920, in addition to a match for the Army against Oxford University. He moved to play for Leicestershire for the 1922 season, playing five County Championship matches in his last year of first-class cricket.

He played twice for the Egypt national side against Free Foresters in April 1927. He scored just one first-class century in his career, an unbeaten 108 against Hampshire in 1919. He died in Sussex in 1940.
