= Egypt national cricket team =

Egypt
- Association: Cricket Committee of Egypt

International Cricket Council
- ICC status: Non-member
- ICC region: Africa

International cricket
- First international: 11 March 1909 v MCC at Gezira Sporting Club, Cairo
- As of 12 April 2008

The Egypt national cricket team is the team that represents the country of Egypt in international cricket matches. They were active from 1909 until World War II.

== History ==
=== Early years ===
Cricket was first played in Egypt in the 19th century, and a cricket club was formed in Alexandria by British residents in 1851. Cricket was very much a recreational activity until the opening of the Suez Canal saw the British population increase (see History of Egypt under the Muhammad Ali dynasty).

More clubs were established by the military, who began to dominate the local game. In October 1884, a combined Army and Navy team played against Alfred Shaw's XI who were on their way to Australia for an Ashes tour.

=== International matches start ===
By 1909, cricket had become the main sporting and social activity of the British population, and standards were good enough for the Marylebone Cricket Club to send a team to tour in 1909. A national side was raised for the first time, and the MCC played three matches against them, winning two and losing the other. They also played matches against local clubs in addition to teams representing the military and civilian populations.

I Zingari toured in March 1914. They played three matches against the national side in addition to matches against Cairo and Alexandria Cricket Club. The matches against the national side saw two draws and one win for the tourists. A return visit of sorts took place later in the year with a combined Egypt/Sudan team playing the MCC at Lord's in a two-day match. The MCC won by ten wickets.

The Free Foresters were the third tourists in 1927, playing twice against the national team, losing the first match and drawing the second. One player in the Free Foresters team on the tour was Hubert Martineau, who was to provide regular opposition for Egypt in the forthcoming years.

Martineau took a team to Egypt every year between 1929 and 1939. The tours typically included two matches against the national side in addition to matches against club and military teams.

=== Decline ===
Although Egypt were playing matches regularly against Martineau's team, the quality of cricket in the country began to decline in the 1930s. As cricket was dominated by the military, the players changed often, leading to a lack of consistency. Players from the local civilian population were often ignored, and only one native Egyptian ever played for the team.

Martineau's tours ceased with the outbreak of the Second World War, and whilst cricket was played in the country during the war, the matches were solely recreational activities for troops stationed in the country. The national team never played again after the war.

Attempts were made to resurrect cricket in the country, with an Egyptian club team touring England in 1951, and playing the MCC at Lord's. Omar Sharif, the filmstar and bridge player, was a member of that team. The players in these clubs were from the upper classes and supported the Egyptian monarchy, leading to little support for cricket when the monarchy was abolished in 1953. The new government took no interest in the game and cricket began a steady decline, with schools stopping their teaching of the game. Gezira Sporting Club played a match against the visiting Pakistan in 1954, but the match was ended early so that the Pakistan players could visit the pyramids and the Sphinx.

Cricket grounds began to be built over, and it was not until the late 1990s that the game saw a resurgence amongst the Indian, Pakistani, Sri Lankan and British expatriate communities. As of 2001, attempts were being made to reintroduce cricket into schools. A cricket league in Cairo was being played by April 2008 and it was hoped that Egypt will eventually take part in the North West African Championship.

=== 2025–Present ===
The Cricket Committee of Egypt, the country's official cricket board was established on 10 July 2025 to oversee and promote the development of cricket within the country.

== Players ==
The only native Egyptian to play for the national team was Abdou Hassanein, who took 17 wickets in his two matches. John Traicos, who played Test cricket for South Africa and Zimbabwe, was born in Zagazig, Egypt. The following players played first-class cricket and played for Egypt:

- Geoffrey MacLaren – played for Lancashire in 1902.
- Richard More – played for Middlesex between 1901 and 1910.
- Geoffrey Rawson – played for the British Army cricket team in 1921.
- Basil Clarke – played for Gloucestershire between 1914 and 1920 and for Leicestershire in 1922.
- James Leaf – played for the Army in 1937.
- Philip Pank – played for the Army in 1925.
- Harold Hinde – played for the combined Minor Counties in 1924.
- Arthur Turner – played for Essex between 1897 and 1910.
- Ronald Joy – played for Essex between 1922 and 1928.
- Thomas Sturgess – played for the Europeans in India in the 1940s.
- Godfrey Firbank – played for the Combined Services in 1922 and for the Army in 1927.
- Eric Cole – played for Kent in 1938.
- Oswald Smith-Bingham – played first-class cricket in India in the 1930s.
- Francis Rogers – played for Gloucestershire between 1924 and 1931.
- Robert Osborne-Smith – played for the Indian Army in the 1930s.
- Robert Melsome – played for Gloucestershire between 1925 and 1938.
- Rodney Palmer – played for Hampshire between 1930 and 1933.
- Alexander Wilkinson – played for the MCC between 1914 and 1939.
- Joshua Chaytor – played for the Free Foresters in 1924.
- Archibald Cassels – played for the Army between 1932 and 1935.
- Rowland Musson – played for the Combined Services in 1937.
- Grahame Cruickshanks – played for Eastern Province in 1931/32.
- Edward Cawston – played for Sussex between 1928 and 1931.
- Thomas Halsey – played for Cambridge University in 1920.
- Cyril Hamilton – played for Kent in 1935.
- Jeff Linton – played for Glamorgan in 1932.
- Ronald Yeldham – played first-class cricket in India in the 1920s.
- Michael Packe – played for Leicestershire between 1936 and 1939.
- John Walford – played for Worcestershire between 1923 and 1930.
- Ralph Crake – played for the MCC in 1901.
- John Burrough – played for Cambridge University between 1893 and 1895.
