= Henry Martineau =

British bobsledder

Personal information
- Nationality: British
- Born: Henry Schwab; 20 July 1904 Chicago, Illinois, United States
- Died: 23 January 1972 (aged 67) St. Moritz, Switzerland

Sport
- Sport: Bobsleigh

Henry Martineau (né Schwab; 20 July 1904 – 23 January 1972) was a British bobsledder. He competed in the four-man event at the 1928 Winter Olympics.

He attended Eton College and Trinity College, Cambridge. Whilst an undergraduate he drove a Bentley sports car, and was President of the Cambridge Footlights dramatic society from 1926 to 1927. His stepfather was Hubert Martineau.

He married twice. In 1930, he married Constance Rosa Watney at St George's Hanover Square, London. They lived at Itchel Manor, Hartley Wintney, Hampshire. Constance died on 14 February 1963 at Hotel Jzum, Storchen, Zurich, Switzerland.
