= Reg Sinfield =

English cricketer

Cricket information
- Batting: Right-handed
- Bowling: Right-arm slow

International information
- National side: England
- Only Test: 10 June 1938 v Australia

Career statistics
Competition	Test	First-class
Matches	1	430
Runs scored	6	15,674
Batting average	6.00	25.69
100s/50s	0/0	16/63
Top score	6	209*
Balls bowled	378	74,556
Wickets	2	1,173
Bowling average	61.50	24.49
5 wickets in innings	0	66
10 wickets in match	0	9
Best bowling	1/51	9/111
Catches/stumpings	0/–	178/–
- Source: CricInfo, 20 July 2021

Reginald Albert Sinfield (1900–1988) was a Gloucestershire cricketer of the 1920s and 1930s.

Sinfield played one Test in the twilight of his career in 1938, where he is best remembered for having Don Bradman as his first Test victim. However, he had a long career with Gloucestershire prior to achieving higher representative honours, during which his steadiness provided a contrast with the attacking style of cricket provided by batsmen like Hammond and Barnett or bowlers like Goddard.

== Biography ==
Sinfield was born on 24 December 1900 at Benington, Hertfordshire.

He played his initial first-class match for Marylebone Cricket Club (MCC) as early as 1921, but his potential was not noticed until 1924, when he began qualifying by residence for Gloucestershire. He was able to play for them in county championship matches in 1926, and showed an ability as a solid opening batsman for them in two innings of over a hundred. In the following years, Sinfield established himself as Gloucestershire's regular opening bat with Alf Dipper and after that player retired in a well-contrasted partnership with Barnett. He also developed as an accurate bowler of slow-medium off-cutters, much quicker and less flighty than Goddard. Though he did not accomplish anything remarkable, Sinfield was very consistent and reached a thousand runs every year from 1927 until 1935, in the process carrying his bat through an innings on five occasions – the most significant being when he scored 161 not out in a total of 374 against Oxford University in 1931.

Sinfield's skill as a bowler was slower to blossom because Charlie Parker and Goddard could do almost everything that was required until the end of 1931. Although he took ninety wickets for under twenty apiece in 1930, it was not until 1934 that Sinfield became recognised as a bowler of class. In that year, he headed the Gloucestershire averages and when the pitch helped him could be formidable indeed, as he showed with thirteen wickets against Nottinghamshire and eight for 40 against Leicestershire. The following year, despite the county's other batsmen declining, Sinfield had his best season with the bat, largely because he increased his range of scoring strokes without losing his defensive strength. In August that year he made his highest score, 209 not out against Glamorgan at Cardiff – and followed that up with a haul of nine wickets for 103.

In 1936, Sinfield developed so much as a bowler that he bowled considerably more overs than anyone else in the country. So consistent was he, until he fractured a finger in the second last match against Essex, that he took 160 first-class wickets and was considered, owing to his accuracy, a strong candidate for the winter's Ashes tour. His most notable feat was nine wickets for 111 against some extremely aggressive Middlesex batting at Lord's – according to Wisden that record "fully demonstrated his steadiness" – and only Goddard's return prevented Sinfield taking all ten. However, very much a natural opening bat, Sinfield was never comfortable when placed lower in the order and he fell well short of 1,000 runs. The following year, he was again tireless and recovered some form with the bat, just reaching four figures, but in 1938, his work as a bowler affected his batting so much that he was frequently as low as No. 10 and did not once reach forty in an innings. In bowling, however, Sinfield worked so well in the frequent absence of Goddard that he was chosen for the First Test at Trent Bridge. Though he was not successful apart from capturing Bradman's wicket and failed to retain his place, Sinfield did have a number of notable bowling feats, including 14 for 110 on a rain-affected wicket against Worcestershire.

In 1939, Sinfield was asked to do much less bowling with Goddard fully fit and devastating on the helpful Bristol turf, but Sinfield did recapture some of his old skill with the bat. Though, since his record was only 835 runs and 66 wickets it could hardly be said he was in his best form. When first-class cricket resumed in 1946 Goddard continued his devastating form for several years, but Sinfield took immediately to coaching at Clifton College and Colston's School. During this period, he championed a number of future Test players, notably Chris Broad, and only retired in his mid-eighties, two years before his death on 17 March 1988 in Ham Green, North Somerset.
