= Cyril Hamilton =

English cricketer

Personal information
- Full name: Cyril Penn Hamilton
- Born: 12 August 1909; Adelaide, South Australia
- Died: 10 February 1941 (aged 31); Keren, Italian Eritrea (Note: Some sources, including Hamilton's Wisden obituary, give his place of death as Libya. The Commonwealth War Graves Commission gives his date of death as 10 February 1941 and he is buried at Keren, over 1,500 km from Libya. His Wisden obituary also gives his age at death as 33 and appears unreliable in this context.)
- Batting: Right-handed
- Bowling: Right-arm slow

Domestic team information
- Years: Team
- 1932–1936: British Army
- 1935: Kent
- FC debut: 22 June 1932 Army v South America
- Last FC: 23 May 1936 Army v Cambridge University

Career statistics
Competition	First-class
Matches	8
Runs scored	475
Batting average	39.58
100s/50s	2/1
Top score	121
Balls bowled	241
Wickets	6
Bowling average	33.83
5 wickets in innings	1
10 wickets in match	0
Best bowling	5/83
Catches/stumpings	8/–
Medal record
Men's squash
British Amateur Championships
Gold medal – first place	1934	singles
- Source: CricInfo, 8 June 2008

Major Cyril Penn Hamilton (12 August 1909 – 10 February 1941) was an Australian born English soldier and sportsman. He played racquets, squash, hockey and first-class cricket and rose to the rank of Major in the Royal Artillery. Hamilton was born in Australia in 1909 and died near Keren in Italian Eritrea at the age of 31 in 1941 whilst on active service during World War II.

== Early life ==
Hamilton was born at Adelaide in South Australia in 1909, the son of James and Virginia Hamilton. His mother was Australian and his father a colonel in the Royal Engineers. Hamilton spent much of his youth in the north of Ireland. He was educated at Wellington College in England between 1922 and 1927 where he played cricket in the school First XI and rackets and acted in theatre productions.

== Military career ==
After leaving school Hamilton won a cadet scholarship to the Royal Military Academy, Woolwich. He graduated from Woolwich in 1929 and joined the Royal Artillery (RA), eventually rising to the rank of Major. He served in Egypt and Mandatory Palestine in 1938 and 1939 with 3rd Regiment RA as World War II broke out.

Hamilton took command of 25th Regiment RA, part of 4th Indian Division, in 1940 in North Africa. He died near Keren in Italian Eritrea on 10 February 1941 during the early stages of the Battle of Keren, part of the East African Campaign. He is buried at the Commonwealth War Graves Commission cemetery at Keren.

== Sporting career ==
Hamilton was an all-round sportsman. He played rackets for his school and for the Royal Military Academy, Woolwich and was the Army and the Amateur squash champion. He won the British Amateur Squash Championships in 1934. He also represented Scotland at hockey in 1936 and 1937 and was a fine cricketer for his school, the Army, the Royal Artillery and a variety of other teams.

He played cricket whilst at Woolwich and appeared regularly for the Royal Artillery Cricket Club, including playing in the annual matches against the Royal Engineers. He made his first-class cricket debut for the Army in 1932 against the South American tourists, and went on to play in eight first-class matches, making his final appearance in 1936 against Cambridge University at Fenner's. As well as playing for the Army, Hamilton made two first-class appearance for Kent County Cricket Club in the 1935 County Championship and played for the Gentlemen against the Players in 1934 at Folkestone.

Hamilton also played cricket for a team representing Egypt, where he was stationed, in 1938 and 1939, for Marylebone Cricket Club (MCC), Gezira Sporting Club and United Services as well as making one appearance for Kent Second XI in the Minor Counties Championship. He scored 205 runs in 1938 playing for the Royal Artillery against the Royal Engineers at Woolwich and scored two first-class centuries, his highest first-class score of 121 runs being made against the touring West Indian team in 1932.

== Family ==
Hamilton married Angela Garnier in 1938 in Norfolk. The couple had one son and lived at Shropham in the county. In 1943 his widow married Peter Studd, who also served in the Royal Artillery during the war.

== Bibliography ==
- Carlaw, Derek (2020). Kent County Cricketers, A to Z: Part Two (1919–1939) (PDF). Cardiff: ACS.
