= 1927 County Championship =

English cricket tournament

- Cricket format: First-class cricket
- Tournament format: League system
- Champions: Lancashire (4th title)

The 1927 County Championship was the 34th officially organised running of the County Championship. Lancashire County Cricket Club won the championship title for a second successive year. In May 1927, Warwickshire beat Yorkshire by eight wickets, which was Yorkshire's first loss in 71 consecutive matches in the County Championship.

== Points Changes ==
Final placings were still decided by calculating the percentage of points gained against possible points available but in March 1927 the MCC revised the points scoring as follows:

- Eight points were awarded for a win
- Four points were awarded for a tie
- Five points for the team leading after the first innings of a drawn match
- Three points for the team losing after the first innings of a drawn match
- Four points for the teams if tied after the first innings of a drawn match
- Four points for a no result on first innings (after more than six hours playing time)
- If the weather reduces a match to less than six hours and there has not been a result on first innings then the match shall be void.

== Table ==
County Championship table
Team	Pld	W	L	DWF	DLF	NR	Pts	%PC
Lancashire	28	10	1	11	5	1	154	68.75
Nottinghamshire	28	12	3	8	4	1	152	67.85
Yorkshire	27	10	3	5	6	3	135	62.54
Kent	26	12	6	4	3	1*	129	62.01
Derbyshire	20	8	3	2	3	4	99	61.87
Surrey	22	8	3	4	5	2*	107	60.79
Leicestershire	22	7	3	5	5	2*	104	59.09
Essex	26	8	8	5	3	2	106	50.96
Middlesex	20	5	5	5	4	1	81	50.62
Sussex	28	7	9	6	2	4*	108	48.92
Warwickshire	23	3	4	7	7	2	88	47.82
Gloucestershire	26	6	7	1	9	3	92	44.23
Hampshire	23	5	9	5	3	1	78	42.39
Somerset	23	3	9	4	7	0	65	35.32
Glamorgan	21	1	8	7	4	1	59	35.11
Northamptonshire	24	4	12	1	6	1	59	30.72
Worcestershire	27	1	17	2	6	1	40	18.51

*includes a tie on first innings
