= 1937 English cricket season =

1937 was the 44th season of County Championship cricket in England and resulted in a 19th championship success for Yorkshire. New Zealand were on tour and England won the Test series 1–0.

== Honours ==
- County Championship – Yorkshire
- Minor Counties Championship – Lancashire II
- Wisden – Tom Goddard, Joe Hardstaff, Leonard Hutton, Jim Parks senior, Eddie Paynter

== Test series ==
England defeated New Zealand 1–0 with two matches drawn.

== Leading batsmen ==
- Wally Hammond topped the averages with 3252 runs @ 65.04
- Jim Parks senior achieved the unique double of 3000 runs and 100 wickets

== Leading bowlers ==
Hedley Verity topped the averages with 202 wickets @ 15.68

== Annual reviews ==
- Wisden Cricketers' Almanack 1938
