= 1933 English cricket season =

1933 was the 40th season of County Championship cricket in England. Yorkshire's dominance continued with a third successive title. England defeated the touring West Indies 2–0.

== Honours ==
- County Championship – Yorkshire
- Minor Counties Championship – undecided
- Wisden – Fred Bakewell, George Headley, Stan Nichols, Leslie Townsend, Cyril Walters

== Test series ==
=== West Indies tour ===
In a three-match series, England defeated West Indies 2–0 with one match drawn.

== Leading batsmen ==
Wally Hammond topped the averages with 3323 runs @ 67.81

== Leading bowlers ==
Hedley Verity topped the averages with 190 wickets @ 13.43

== Annual reviews ==
- Wisden Cricketers' Almanack 1934
