= 1924 English cricket season =

1924 was the 31st season of County Championship cricket in England. Yorkshire secured a hat-trick of titles. England, in their first home series since 1921, proved too strong for South Africa and won the Test series 3–0.

== Honours ==
- County Championship - Yorkshire
- Minor Counties Championship - Berkshire
- Wisden Cricketers of the Year - Robert Catterall, Jack MacBryan, Herbie Taylor, Dick Tyldesley, Dodger Whysall

== Test series ==
England defeated South Africa 3–0 with two matches drawn. There was a sensational start to the series when the visitors were bowled out in their first innings in the First Test at Edgbaston for 30, in just 12.3 overs, after England had made over 400. Arthur Gilligan, the Sussex and England captain, and his county colleague Maurice Tate, making his Test debut, bowled unchanged, with the former taking 6/7 and the latter 4/12.

== Leading batsmen ==
Andy Sandham topped the averages with 2082 runs with an average of 59.48.

== Leading bowlers ==
George Macaulay topped the averages with 190 wickets with an average of 13.23

== Annual reviews ==
- Wisden Cricketers' Almanack 1925
