= 1927 English cricket season =

1927 was the 34th season of County Championship cricket in England. Lancashire retained the title. A New Zealand team toured but there were no Test matches. Douglas Jardine and Harold Larwood topped the batting and bowling averages respectively.

== Honours ==
- County Championship - Lancashire
- Minor Counties Championship - Staffordshire
- Wisden Cricketers of the Year, named in the 1928 edition of Wisden Cricketers' Almanack – Roger Blunt, Charlie Hallows, Wally Hammond, Douglas Jardine, Vallance Jupp

== Leading batsmen ==
Douglas Jardine topped the averages with 1002 runs @ 91.09

== Leading bowlers ==
Harold Larwood topped the averages with 100 wickets @ 16.95

== Annual reviews ==
- Wisden Cricketers' Almanack 1928
