= 1928 English cricket season =

1928 was the 35th season of County Championship cricket in England. The first Test series between England and West Indies team in England was won 3–0 by the host nation. Lancashire completed a hat-trick of titles.

== Honours ==
- County Championship – Lancashire
- Minor Counties Championship – Berkshire
- Wisden – Leslie Ames, George Duckworth, Maurice Leyland, Sam Staples, Jack White

== Test series ==
West Indies made its first Test Match tour of England and were hopelessly outclassed by the hosts, who won all three Tests by an innings.

== Leading batsmen ==
Douglas Jardine topped the averages with 1133 runs @ 87.15

== Leading bowlers ==
Harold Larwood topped the averages with 138 wickets @ 14.51

== Annual reviews ==
- Wisden Cricketers' Almanack 1929
