= 1932 English cricket season =

1932 was the 39th season of County Championship cricket in England. England played India in a home Test series for the first time and won 1–0. Yorkshire retained the championship.

== Honours ==
- County Championship – Yorkshire
- Minor Counties Championship – Buckinghamshire
- Wisden – Ewart Astill, Freddie Brown, Alec Kennedy, C. K. Nayudu, Bill Voce

== Test series ==
=== India tour ===
England played a single Test against India at Lord's Cricket Ground and won by 158 runs.

== Leading batsmen ==
Herbert Sutcliffe topped the averages with 3336 runs @ 74.13

== Leading bowlers ==
Harold Larwood topped the averages with 162 wickets @ 12.86

== Annual reviews ==
- Wisden Cricketers' Almanack 1933
