= 1925 English cricket season =

1925 was the 32nd season of County Championship cricket in England. There was no Test series and the focus was ostensibly upon the County Championship (won by Yorkshire), except that the season was dominated by Jack Hobbs who scored a then-record 16 centuries and 3,024 runs. Along the way, he equaled and then surpassed the career record for most centuries, previously held by W. G. Grace. Wisden decided to honour Hobbs thus: "the Five Cricketers of the Year are dropped in favour of one player, this time Jack Hobbs, in recognition of his overtaking W. G. Grace as the most prolific century-maker of all time".

== Honours ==
- County Championship - Yorkshire
- Minor Counties Championship - Buckinghamshire
- Wisden Cricketer of the Year - Jack Hobbs

== Leading batsmen ==
Jack Hobbs topped the averages with 3024 runs @ 77.60 and his season record 16 centuries.

== Leading bowlers ==
Another veteran, Wilfred Rhodes was the leading bowler with an average of 14.86 and 115 wickets.

== Annual reviews ==
- Wisden Cricketers' Almanack 1926
