= 1931 English cricket season =

1931 was the 38th season of County Championship cricket in England. New Zealand played their first Test series in England, the hosts winning 1–0. Yorkshire won the championship.

== Honours ==
- County Championship – Yorkshire
- Minor Counties Championship – Leicestershire II
- Wisden – Bill Bowes, Charles Dempster, James Langridge, Nawab of Pataudi, senior, Hedley Verity

== Test series ==
=== New Zealand tour ===
England defeated the first New Zealand tourists 1–0 with two matches drawn.

== Leading batsmen ==
Herbert Sutcliffe topped the averages with 3006 runs @ 96.96

== Leading bowlers ==
Harold Larwood topped the averages with 129 wickets @ 12.03

== Annual reviews ==
- Wisden Cricketers' Almanack 1932
