= British Army cricket team =

UK cricket team

The Army cricket team is a cricket team representing the British Army.

The Army team played 51 first-class matches between 1912 and 1939, although a combined Army and Navy team had played two games against a combined Oxford and Cambridge team in 1910 and 1911. In 1927 the Army played the touring New Zealanders, and in 1933 they played the touring West Indians.

After the Second World War, for first-class purposes the Army team amalgamated with the Navy and Air Force teams to form the Combined Services team, which played first-class cricket until 1964.

The Army team continues to play cricket at non-first-class level. It is managed by the Army Cricket Association. The army also has another team in Germany, known as BA(G). The main team occasionally organises friendlies with allies, particularly against its army counterparts from cricket-playing nations such as Afghanistan and South Africa, and charities matches against local clubs.

Its home ground is the Officers Club Services Ground, Aldershot, Hampshire.

== See also ==
- Royal Navy cricket team
- Royal Air Force cricket team
- Combined Services cricket team
