= Hubert Martineau =

English cricketer and cricket patron

Personal information
- Full name: Hubert Melville Martineau
- Born: 24 October 1891; Westminster, London
- Died: 11 September 1976 (aged 84); Westminster, London
- Batting: Right-handed
- Bowling: Left-arm orthodox spin

Domestic team information
- Years: Team
- 1931–1932: HDG Leveson-Gower's XI
- FC debut: 27 June 1931 HDG Leveson-Gower's XI v Oxford University
- Last FC: 29 June 1932 HDG Leveson-Gower's XI v Oxford University

Career statistics
Competition	First-class
Matches	3
Runs scored	44
Batting average	11.00
100s/50s	0/0
Top score	19*
Balls bowled	126
Wickets	0
Bowling average	–
5 wickets in innings	–
10 wickets in match	–
Best bowling	–
Catches/stumpings	0/–
- Source: CricketArchive, 12 April 2008

Hubert Melville Martineau (24 October 1891 – 11 September 1976) was an English patron of cricket and organiser of his own team. He also played three first-class matches between 1931 and 1932. When he played, he was a right-handed batsman and left-arm orthodox spin bowler.

== Biography ==
Born in Westminster in 1891, the son of Sir Philip Martineau, Hubert Martineau was educated at Eton, though he did not play for the school's cricket team. He did however develop a great love of the game.

Club cricket of a high standard was played at his private ground near Maidenhead between 1923 and 1939, and four national sides touring England began their tours playing against his personal XI; Australia in 1926, New Zealand in 1927, the West Indies in 1928 and India in 1932. Martineau himself played in all those matches with the exception of the 1926 match against Australia.

In 1927, he went on a tour of Egypt with the Free Foresters, playing two matches against the national side. He took his own team to the country each year between 1929 and 1939, and Martineau played in each match.

He played three first-class matches in the early 1930s, for HDG Leveson-Gower's XI. He played against Oxford University in 1931 and against Cambridge and Oxford University in 1932. He died in Westminster in 1976.

His stepson was Henry Martineau.

== Politics ==
Martineau was a member of the Liberal Party, and stood for them in Monmouth at the 1918 general election. He failed to be elected.

General election 1918: Monmouth
Party	Candidate	Votes	%	±%
Unionist	Leolin Forestier-Walker	9,164	59.7	N/A
Liberal	Hubert Martineau	6,189	40.3	N/A
Majority		2,975	19.4	N/A
Turnout		15,353	55.7	N/A
Registered electors		27,575		
Unionist win (new seat)				
