= Stuart Boyes =

English cricketer

Personal information
- Full name: George Stuart Boyes
- Born: 31 March 1899; Southampton, Hampshire, England
- Died: 11 February 1973 (aged 73); Southampton, Hampshire, England
- Batting: Right-handed
- Bowling: Slow left-arm orthodox

Domestic team information
- Years: Team
- 1921–1939: Hampshire
- 1926/27: Marylebone Cricket Club

Career statistics
Competition	First-class
Matches	504
Runs scored	8,078
Batting average	14.95
100s/50s	2/17
Top score	104
Balls bowled	85,860
Wickets	1,472
Bowling average	23.51
5 wickets in innings	74
10 wickets in match	11
Best bowling	9/57
Catches/stumpings	495/–
- Source: Cricinfo, 15 October 2024

George Stuart Boyes (31 March 1899 – 11 February 1973) was an English first-class cricketer, born in Southampton, who played for Hampshire County Cricket Club.

== Cricket ==
=== Early life and career ===
George Stuart Boyes was born in Southampton on 31 March 1899. Boye's talents as a slow left-arm orthodox bowler were noticed when he was aged 14 by the Hampshire cricketer Alex Bowell. He presented him to the club's secretary, Francis Bacon, who engaged Boyes on the staff in 1913. Prior to debuting for Hampshire, he played club cricket in Southampton. His first-class debut for Hampshire came against Surrey at Bournemouth in the 1921 County Championship; playing as an amateur, he made five Championship appearances in his debut season. Prior to the 1922 season, he was employed at the Ordnance Survey and was a serving member of the Royal Engineers. From the 1922 season, he played as a paid professional, with Hampshire having paid half of his discharge fee from the army. He established himself in the team in 1922, making 28 appearances and taking 94 wickets at a bowling average of 18.82; he took five wickets in an innings on seven occasions, and ten-wickets in a match twice. His presence in the team gave support to fellow spinner Alec Kennedy, and was said to have been a factor in Kennedy's improved bowling. Boyes played in an unlikely victory by 155 runs against Warwickshire in the County Championship at Edgbaston in June. Hampshire were dismissed for 15 runs in their first innings and were forced to follow on 228 runs behind; Boyes was one of eight batsmen to be dismissed without scoring. They performed better in the second innings, making 521 runs; batting at number ten, he shared in a partnership of 70 runs for the final wicket with Walter Livsey.

In the 1923 season, Boyes made 15 first-class appearances, taking 36 wickets at 24.91. He missed a large part of July after injuring his knee at the beginning of the month, and despite returning for their County Championship match against Kent on 4 August, he suffered a strain in the match and missed the remainder of the season. The following season, he took 68 wickets at 27.33 from 29 appearances; his best figures that season came against Worcestershire, taking 6 for 36 in a performance that exhibited good length and a great deal of spin. From 28 appearances in the 1925 season, he took 90 wickets at 21.30, taking five or more wickets in an innings on four occasions, and ten wickets in a match once. Against Surrey in July, he took his first career hat-trick. In the 1926 season, he took a hundred wickets in a season for the first time, with 105 at 22.89. He took five or more wickets in an innings on six occasions, with best figures of 7 for 51 against Essex in June, whilst earlier in the season he had taken 6 for 17 against Northamptonshire. He was Hampshire's second highest wicket-taker in the 1926 County Championship with 102, behind Jack Newman's 145. He also claimed a second hat-trick during the season, against Warwickshire. Although he averaged 8.80 runs with the bat across the season, Boyes made his first career half-century, with 50 against Sussex in May — a match in which he also took 6 for 23.

=== Tour selection ===
Boyes' success in 1926 led to his selection for the Marylebone Cricket Club (MCC) winter tour of India and Ceylon, alongside teammate George Brown. He played 23 first-class matches on the tour — 23 in India and four in Ceylon. During the Indian leg of the tour, he took 53 wickets at an average of 18.03, taking five or more wickets in an innings thrice. His best figures, 7 for 52, came against the Europeans in the East at Calcutta. In the 1927 English season, he made 26 first-class appearances in the County Championship. However, he had less success bowling, with 34 wickets at 37.85. Hampshire's bowling was dominated by Kennedy and Newman, who took 199 wickets between them during the season. Batting, he scored 384 runs at 15.36, making a second career half-century; it was noted by the Bournemouth Times and Directory that by the end of the season his batting had improved, whilst opining that he had become Hampshire's "soundest fieldsman". His bowling form improved the following season, with Boyes taking 77 wickets at 26.59; five times he took five or more wickets in an innings, and took ten wickets in match twice. His improved batting was rewarded with him being promoted up the batting order, opening alongside Kennedy by July. From 29 appearances in 1928, he made his highest season aggregate to that point, scoring 602 runs with two half-centuries. At the end of the season, he represented the Players for the first time in the Gentlemen versus Players match at Bournemouth.

Despite straining a muscle in his bowling arm, caused by overbowling in the nets, and injury ruling him out toward the end of the season, Boyes still managed to take 74 wickets at 23.45 from 23 matches in the 1929 season, claiming five or more wickets four times. He fell just short of taking a hundred wickets in the 1930 season, with 97 at 20.49, with eight five wicket hauls alongside taking ten wickets in a match twice. He achieved his career best figures to that point, with 8 for 37 in a 3 run County Championship defeat to Leicestershire in June. In 26 matches across the season, his aggregate was 483 runs at 16.10. At the end of the season he participated in the Folkestone Cricket Festival (Note: The Folkestone Cricket Festival was founded by Freddie Calthorpe. It was a late season festival of first-class cricket that took place until 1938.), playing one match for the Players against the Gentlemen; he achievied his highest first-class score to that point, with an unbeaten 95 runs, largely made in a partnership of 140 runs for the tenth wicket with Albert Thomas.

Boyes was a slow left-arm bowler with a high action, taking 1415 wickets for Hampshire. He took 100 wickets in a season three times, his best year being 111 at 26.75 in 1933. He twice took a hattrick, one of them when he took his career best figures of 9 for 57 against Somerset at Yeovil in 1938. With the bat he took 413 matches before making his maiden century, only three players in history have waited longer. He was an excellent close fielder and took 498 catches in first-class matches, many of them at short-leg.

== Playing style and statistics ==
mentions style

mentions usefulness

== Coaching career ==
During the Second World War, Boyes supervised junior coaching sessions at the County Ground. Following the end of the war in 1945, Boyes was employed as a cricket coach at Ampleforth College from 1946 to 1963.

== Football ==
Boyes played association football for in the Hampshire League for Southampton Civil Service F.C. in the 1925-26 English football season.

== Personal life and death ==
His brother, Ken, was a professional footballer with Southampton and Bristol Rovers, as well as a member of Hampshire's ground staff. He died in Southampton in February 1973.
