= George Brown (cricketer, born 1887) =

English cricketer (1887–1964)

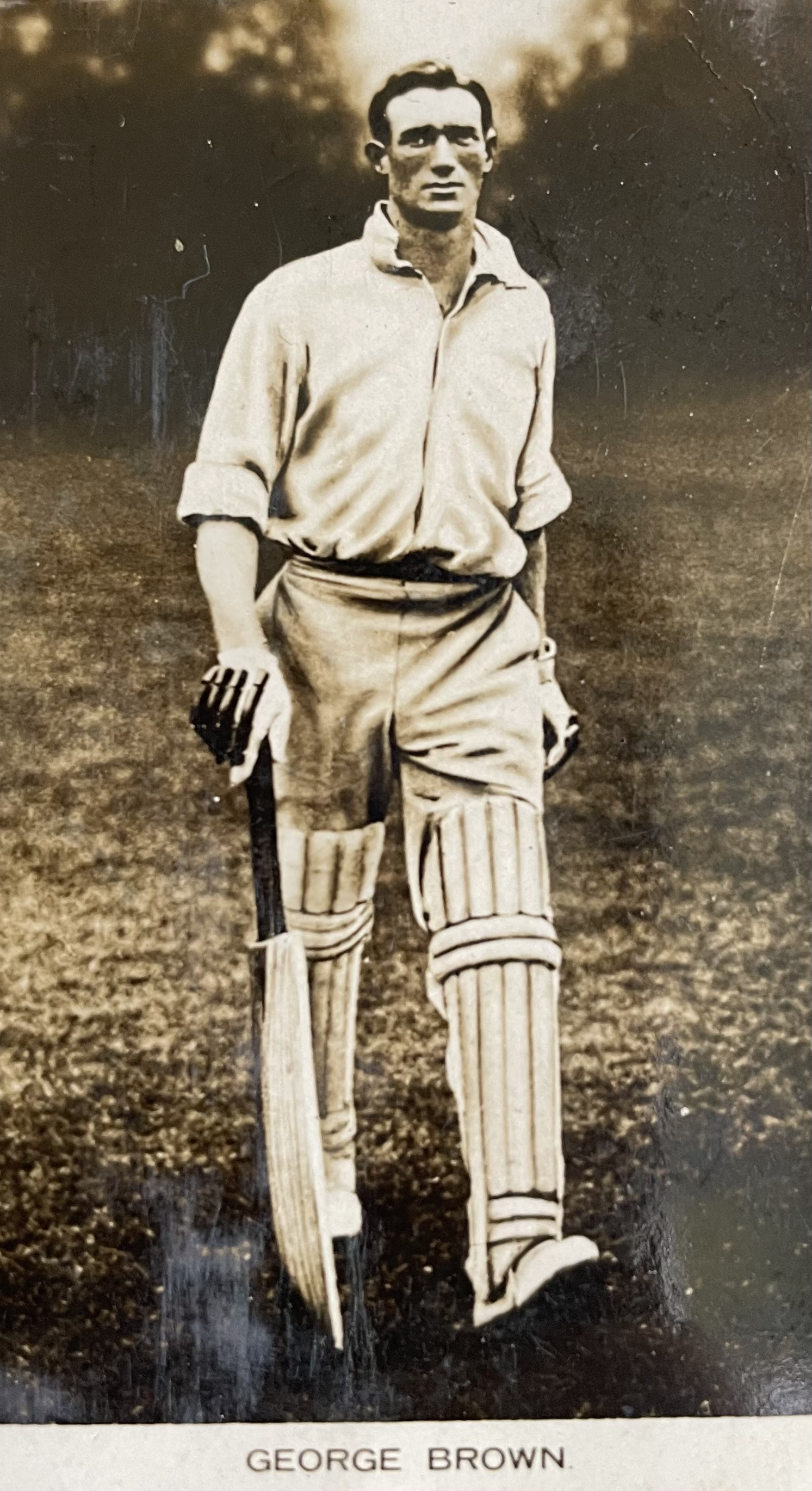

Personal information
- Born: 6 October 1887; Cowley, Oxfordshire, England
- Died: 3 December 1964 (aged 77); Winchester, Hampshire, England
- Height: 6 ft 3 in (1.91 m)
- Batting: Left-handed
- Bowling: Right-arm medium
- Role: All-rounder, wicket-keeper

International information
- National side: England (1921–1923)
- Test debut (cap 199): 2 July 1921 v Australia
- Last Test: 16 February 1923 v South Africa

Domestic team information
- Years: Team
- 1908–1933: Hampshire
- 1910/11–1930: Marylebone Cricket Club

Umpiring information
- FC umpired: 45 (1935–1936)

Career statistics
Competition	Test	First-class
Matches	7	612
Runs scored	299	25,649
Batting average	29.90	26.71
100s/50s	0/2	37/111
Top score	84	232*
Balls bowled	–	31,848
Wickets	–	626
Bowling average	–	29.81
5 wickets in innings	–	23
10 wickets in match	–	2
Best bowling	–	8/55
Catches/stumpings	9/3	567/79
- Source: Cricinfo, 20 September 2019

George Brown (6 October 1887 – 3 December 1964) was an English professional cricketer who played in seven Test matches between 1921 and 1923 and in English county cricket with Hampshire from 1908 to 1933. Brown was born in Cowley and made his debut in first-class cricket for Hampshire in 1908. He soon established himself as one of the finest all-rounders in county cricket. After strong performances for Hampshire following the First World War, Brown made his Test debut for England against Australia in the 1921 Ashes series. Despite not being Hampshire's regular wicket-keeper, he was chosen in the England side to fulfil this role. He performed well against the Australian fast bowlers Jack Gregory and Ted McDonald and was described by the cricket writer A. A. Thomson as "one of the few English heroes of the ill-starred 1921 Tests". He toured South Africa in 1922–23, playing in four of the five Tests to conclude his brief Test career. Brown continued to play county cricket until 1933, when injury forced him to retire. He then spent two seasons on the first-class umpires list.

Brown appeared in 612 first-class matches, scoring 25,649 runs, taking 626 wickets, claiming 567 catches, and making 79 stumpings. An aggressive left-handed batsman, for Hampshire he scored 22,962 runs from 539 appearances. His runs aggregate for the county is bettered only by Roy Marshall and Phil Mead. He took 602 wickets for Hampshire with his right-arm medium pace bowling, which was delivered with sharp, late outswing, and early in his career was said to border on being genuinely fast. He was a renowned fielder, being considered "the finest fielder in the world" by the Hampshire Advertiser in 1920. The cricket historian John Arlott would later write that he was "the most complete all-round cricketer the game has ever known".

After his playing career, Brown settled in Winchester, where he became a publican and later a parking attendant. In his latter years he was afflicted by several illnesses; he died in hospital in Winchester on 3 December 1964, aged 77. His ashes were scattered over the County Ground in Southampton, where he had played for 25 years.

== Cricket career ==
=== Early life and cricket career ===
George Brown was born in Cowley on 6 October 1887. In early adulthood he worked as an attendant at the Littlemore Hospital near Oxford, and played for the hospital cricket team. While playing against Oxford University he was observed by the cricketer C. B. Fry, who asked with Brown if he wished to pursue a career as a professional cricketer. He was then offered a cricket trial with Hampshire in 1906, walking the 60 miles (97 km) from Oxford to Southampton while hauling his possessions in a tin trunk. He subsequently joined the ground staff at Hampshire alongside Alex Bowell, Alec Kennedy, Walter Livsey, Phil Mead, and Jack Newman; together, they formed the county's first major intake of professional cricketers. An all-rounder, Brown made his first-class debut for Hampshire against the touring Gentlemen of Philadelphia at Southampton in 1908, deputising as wicket-keeper for Jimmy Stone. To play for Hampshire in the County Championship, he had to qualify to play through a two-year residency period, which by the 1909 season he had served. He established himself in the Hampshire team in 1909, making 23 appearances and scoring 530 runs at an average of 17.09. With his medium pace bowling, he took 39 wickets at an average of 25.03. In just his second County Championship match, he claimed his maiden five-wicket haul with figures of 5 for 47 against Somerset; he took five or more wickets in two further innings during the season.

In 23 appearances in 1910, Brown scored 859 runs at an average of 26.84, recording his maiden first-class century with an unbeaten 106 runs against Middlesex in the County Championship in June. He took 23 wickets across the season, averaging 22.56. Following the conclusion of the 1910 season, Brown was selected to tour the West Indies with the Marylebone Cricket Club (MCC) in February–April 1911. (Note: The MCC held the responsibility of organising overseas tours from 1903 to 1977. All matches on a tour were played as MCC, except for Test matches, where the side played as England.) He made eleven first-class appearances on the tour, against regional representative sides and the West Indian team. The tour was not a success for Brown, who scored 298 runs at an average of 14.90 and took 9 wickets at an average of 45.44. The 1911 English season was his most successful as a bowler, taking 88 wickets at an average of 25.89. He claimed five or more wickets in an innings on five occasions and ten wickets in a match once; he ended the season as Hampshire's leading wicket-taker in the County Championship, with 87 wickets, 20 ahead of Newman's 67. (Note: Brown played two matches for the Marylebone Cricket Club (MCC) at the beginning of the 1911 season, taking one wicket. The remainder of his wickets came for Hampshire in the County Championship.) He passed a thousand runs in a season for the first time in 1911, scoring 1,327 runs from 27 matches at an average of 27.64, with two centuries.

Brown was less prolific in 1912, averaging 20.32 from 29 innings, and 31.82 for his 47 wickets. He did play an important part in Hampshire's defeat of the touring Australians, taking four key wickets. His form with both bat and ball improved in the 1913 season. He passed a thousand runs for the second time, and against Essex at Leyton he was involved in a record-breaking partnership, after Hampshire had been asked to follow on 317 runs behind Essex's first innings total. Brown made an unbeaten 140 runs, sharing in a seventh wicket partnership of 325 runs with Cecil Abercrombie; as of 2026 this remains a Hampshire record for that wicket. He was Hampshire's second-highest wicket-taker in the County Championship with 83 wickets, behind Newman's 105, and achieved his career-best figures of 8 for 55 against Gloucestershire at Cheltenham, a bowling display characterised by considerable swing.

In the 1914 season, which was truncated in August by the outbreak of the First World War, he scored 890 runs at an average of 18.54 from 30 matches, but did not score a century. He also took 54 wickets at an average of 27.85, but did not achieve any five-wicket hauls. The MCC President Francis Lacey confirmed the cessation of cricket during the war, and first-class cricket in England remained suspended until 1919. Unlike many of his peers, Brown did not immediately enlist. In February 1915, he was made superintendent of a recreation hall built near Southampton Docks which had been furnished by Hampshire County Cricket Club and was to be used by troops. He enlisted in the British Army in January 1916 and joined the Labour Corps in 1917, though he did not see action. He was discharged in August 1918, on account of rheumatism, receiving the Silver War Badge.

=== Post-war resumption ===
After the war, Brown returned to a Hampshire team that had been greatly weakened by the deaths of several players. In 1919, Brown was selected to represent the Players for the first time in the Gentlemen versus Players match at The Oval; as a paid professional he represented the Players, in contrast to unpaid amateurs who played for the Gentlemen. Later in the season he was chosen to play for the South against the Australian Imperial Forces. Brown made 19 appearances in the 1919 season, scoring 978 runs at an average of 34.92, making one century and six half-centuries. In the latter half of the season, he kept wicket in place of Sydney Maartensz, himself deputising for Walter Livsey, who was still on active military service. Despite the sparing use of his bowling in 1919 (he bowled just 387 balls), he was adjudged by the Bournemouth Times and Directory in August to be the best all-rounder in England.

From 27 appearances in 1920, Brown scored 1,889 runs at an average of 43.93; he made six centuries during the season, including two double centuries. The first, an unbeaten 232 in June, contributed to an innings victory (Note: A victory by an innings refers to the team bowling last winning the game, having only batted one innings compared to its opponent's two, thereby winning by an innings and a number of runs.) against the reigning County Champions, Yorkshire; the second, a score of 230, came against Essex in August in a drawn match. Earlier in the season against Gloucestershire, he shared in a Hampshire record partnership of 321 runs for the second wicket with Edward Barrett, a record that would stand until 2011, when it was surpassed by James Adams and Carberry. Brown ended the season as Hampshire's leading run scorer in the County Championship. With Kennedy and Newman leading Hampshire's bowling attack in 1920, Brown only took 26 wickets at an average of 30.96. Brown made his second appearance in a Gentlemen versus Players match, which was held at Lord's, his double century against Yorkshire having earned him selection for the Players. Midway through the season, Accrington of the Lancashire League attempted to sign Brown as their professional for the 1921 season, but the move failed to materialise. (Note: From 1900, the Lancashire League permittted each member club to have only one professional. Per league rules, a player could not play as a professional for a team outside of the league during a season, including in county cricket.)

=== Test cricket ===
In May 1921, Brown played for the MCC against the touring Australians, and at the end of June he was selected in the Gentlemen versus Players match at Lord's, keeping wicket and scoring 77 runs in the Players' only innings. The match was played after England had suffered two heavy defeats against Australia in the 1921 Ashes series, and were looking to strengthen their batting for the 3rd Test. Despite not being Hampshire's regular wicket-keeper, Brown was controversially selected as a replacement for specialist wicket-keeper Bert Strudwick for the final three Tests of the series. On his Test debut at Headingley, Brown made a half-century (57 runs) from the middle order in England's first innings and scored 46 runs opening the batting in their second. He kept wicket wearing motorbike gloves, as opposed to wicket-keeper's gloves. England lost the Test by 219 runs, with Brown's performance being described by the Daily Chronicle as "confident" and "sound". In the 4th Test at Old Trafford, he made 31 runs opening the batting in England's only innings of a rain-affected match, and in the drawn 5th Test he opened the batting and scored 32 and 84, the latter as part of a first-wicket partnership of 158 runs with Jack Russell. The cricket writer A. A. Thomson later described him as "one of the few English heroes of the ill-starred 1921 Tests", with the cricket historian John Arlott remarking how he had played well against the fast bowlers Jack Gregory and Ted McDonald, against whom his contemporaries struggled. Across the entirety of the 1921 season, Brown made 31 appearances in first-class cricket (Test matches inclusive), scoring 1,381 runs at an average of 28.18 and taking 37 wickets at an average of 23.70.

Brown scored 988 runs at an average of 21.18 from 28 appearances in 1922, while taking 17 wickets at an average of 34.94. He played in an unlikely victory by 155 runs against Warwickshire at Edgbaston in the County Championship in June. Hampshire were dismissed for 15 runs in their first innings and were forced to follow on 228 runs behind; Brown was one of eight batsmen to be dismissed without scoring. They performed better in the second innings, making 521 runs; he top-scored with 172 runs and shared in a partnership of 177 runs for the ninth wicket with Livsey, which was made in only 140 minutes. In July, he was invited to join the MCC's winter tour of South Africa. He played for the MCC in the four first-class matches that preceded the 1st Test against South Africa at Johannesburg. He featured in four of the five Tests on the tour, scoring just 49 runs from seven innings. He was initially in the team as a batsman and was Livsey's deputy as wicket-keeper, but Livsey broke a finger in the tour match against North Eastern Districts and so Brown kept wicket. In the 3rd Test he was dropped in favour of the specialist wicket-keeper George Street, but was preferred over Street for the final two Tests.

=== Later career ===
Brown's batting declined from 1923 to 1925; he scored less than a thousand runs in each season and averaged under 23. He continued to take wickets, with 27 in 1923, 44 in 1924, and 48 in 1925; in the latter season, he claimed 7 for 60 in a defeat against Sussex at Horsham. The 1926 season was his most successful, scoring 2,040 runs from 31 matches at an average of exactly 40, with six centuries. Despite surpassing 2,000 runs for the only time in his career, he was not Hampshire's leading run-scorer in the County Championship; that accolade belonged to Mead (2,274 runs). Opening the batting in the second innings against Middlesex at Bournemouth in August, Brown carried his bat with an unbeaten 103 runs in Hampshire's total of 188 for 9, helping to secure a draw. His five centuries by July earned him a recall to the Test team for the 5th Test of the 1926 Ashes series, but just before the Test he injured his thumb while making his sixth century of the season against Leicestershire, and was forced to withdraw. At the end of the season he participated in the Folkestone Cricket Festival (Note: The Folkestone Cricket Festival was founded by Freddie Calthorpe. It was a late season festival of first-class cricket that took place until 1938.), playing one match each for his Hampshire captain Lionel Tennyson's XI and for the MCC.

Brown was chosen in the touring party for the MCC's winter tour of India and Ceylon, which lasted from November 1926 to February 1927. He played in sixteen first-class matches on the Indian leg of tour, scoring 591 runs at an average of 26.86, and two first-class matches in Ceylon, scoring 79 runs. In the 1927 English season, Brown scored 1,866 runs at an average of 40.56 from 31 matches. He scored four centuries, including his third career double century, a score of 204 runs against Yorkshire at Portsmouth; during the innings, he also established a Hampshire record partnership for the third wicket of 344 runs with Mead; this stood until 2011, when surpassed by Michael Carberry and Neil McKenzie's 523 runs partnership against Yorkshire. At the conclusion of the season, he participated for a second time in the Folkestone Cricket Festival. In 1928, he was afforded a benefit match at the end of June against Surrey, raising £1,000. Brown tore a ligament in the match, keeping him out of the Hampshire team for three weeks and limiting him to 18 appearances. He played 27 matches in 1929, scoring 1,458 runs at an average of 29.75. In July, he escaped serious injury after suffering a motorcycle accident that left him with extensive bruising to his face, neck and chest, leaving him unable to play for around a week.

Brown deputised for Livsey as wicket-keeper at the beginning of the 1930 season, after Livsey had returned home ill from a winter coaching engagement in South Africa and was invalided out for the entire season. In 32 appearances in 1930, Brown scored 1,530 runs at an average of 28.33 and made two centuries; as wicket-keeper, he took 48 catches and made 16 stumpings. Such was his batting and wicket-keeping form in the season, there was speculation that he would earn a Test recall for the 1930 Ashes series, but George Duckworth was preferred. Brown played for the MCC for the final time in 1930, playing in a draw against Surrey at Lord's. With Livsey's illness forcing his retirement, Brown was preferred as Hampshire's first-choice wicket-keeper in 1931, making 25 appearances. He scored 1,032 runs at an average of exactly 24, took 37 catches, and made 13 stumpings. For the 1932 season, he was replaced as first-choice wicket-keeper by his 20-year-old understudy Neil McCorkell.

Brown toured Jamaica with Lord Tennyson's thirteen-man team in February–March 1932, making three first-class appearances against Jamaica. Returning to England, he featured in 29 first-class matches in the 1932 season, scoring 1,223 runs at an average of 23.51 and making two centuries. Brown made 26 appearances in the 1933 season, scoring 1,075 runs at an average of exactly 25. He made one century during the season, carrying his bat with an unbeaten 150 runs against Surrey. In June, he fractured his finger, causing him to miss three matches. There was speculation that Brown would retire from first-class cricket at the end of the 1933 season to play for Rishton in the Lancashire League, but he remained with Hampshire into the 1934 season. He was injured in an accident before the season commenced, and did not sufficiently recover to play during the summer; he retired in September, alongside Kennedy. In recognition of his contribution to Hampshire cricket he was granted a testimonial in 1934 that raised £292, which was presented to him in December by the chairman of the Southern Daily Echo newspaper and former Hampshire cricketer Sir Russell Bencraft.

=== Playing style and statistics ===
The cricket writer Bill Frindall described Brown as "an outstanding all-round cricketer in the fullest sense", and Arlott considered him "the most complete all-round cricketer the game has ever known". Summarising his all-round credentials, Thomson wrote that he "could bat, bowl, [and] keep wicket". Frindall remarked that he was a "dashing left-handed batsman", with Arlott describing him as having an "upright" batting stance and a "threateningly high" backlift. He was adept at both hooking and driving the ball, as well as his own shot – the whip – a forward shot played to any ball that was fast and short. The cricket journalist Scyld Berry credits Brown with playing the first recorded scoop shot. He was strong against fast bowling, but was considered less adept against spin bowling. Brown's height of 6 foot 3 inches (1.9 metres) and strong physical build were well suited to his aggressive batting style, though Frindall also considered him good in defence when the match situation demanded a more measured approach. Conversely, E. W. Swanton theorised that Brown's approach was more a reflection of his mood on the day, as opposed to the state of the match, an opinion shared by Arlott. He used his physicality to mock his opponents, as he did against Kent in 1913 when he deliberately "chested" two deliveries from Arthur Fielder, laughing as he did so and remarking "He's not fast"; at the time, Fielder was considered the fastest bowler in England. His physical strength also enabled him to bowl for long periods. In his younger years, Brown's bowling bordered on being genuinely fast, and used sharp, late outswing. He bowled less frequently later in his career, but even into his forties was said to still take "good wickets".

Across his first-class career, Brown made 612 appearances. In these, he scored 25,649 runs at an average of 26.71. He scored a thousand runs or more in a season on eleven occasions. For Hampshire he made 539 appearances, scoring 22,962 runs; he has the third-highest number of runs for the county in first-class cricket, behind Roy Marshall and Mead. He made 37 centuries and 96 half-centuries for Hampshire, and shared in a three-figure partnership for every wicket, except the sixth. In his seven Test matches, Brown scored 299 runs at an average of 29.90. He took 626 wickets at an average of 29.81 in his first-class career, 602 wickets of which were for Hampshire, taking five wickets or more in an innings on 23 occasions and ten wickets in a match twice.

Brown often fielded at silly point and silly mid-off, being described as a "fearless close fielder" by Frindall. Thomson described how his fielding was aided by having "carpet-bag hands" and that he could "stop a cannon-ball anywhere else in the field", with Swanton comparing him to Percy Chapman, who R. C. Robertson-Glasgow considered one of the greatest fielders of all time. Before the First World War, Brown was described as the furthest thrower in first-class cricket, with the Hampshire Advertiser considering him to be "the finest fielder in the world" in 1920. Even into his forties, the Illustrated Sporting and Dramatic News commented that he "still possesses as safe a pair of hands as there is in the country". Despite not being Hampshire's regular wicket-keeper, Gilbert Jessop said that he proved himself to be a brilliant wicket-keeper at Test level, with Kennedy opining that Brown was "unquestionably the best wicket-keeper who ever took my bowling". In his entire first-class career he took 567 catches and made 79 stumpings, including 9 catches and 3 stumpings in Test cricket. For Hampshire, he took 485 catches and made 50 stumpings.

== Umpiring career ==
Following his retirement, Brown was one of four new appointments to the first-class umpires list ahead of the 1935 season. He spent two seasons on the list, standing in 45 matches. Before the 1935 season, an experimental law was introduced in which the batsman could be dismissed leg before wicket (lbw) even if the ball pitched outside the line of off stump. In one of the first matches of the 1935 County Championship between Kent and Leicestershire, Brown became the first umpire to declare a batsman 'out' using the experimental new law, when he adjudged Peter Sunnucks lbw by Haydon Smith. He was omitted from the list of first-class umpires on 30 November 1936, during a meeting of county captains at Lord's that was convened to select the 23 umpires for the 1937 season.

== Later life and death ==
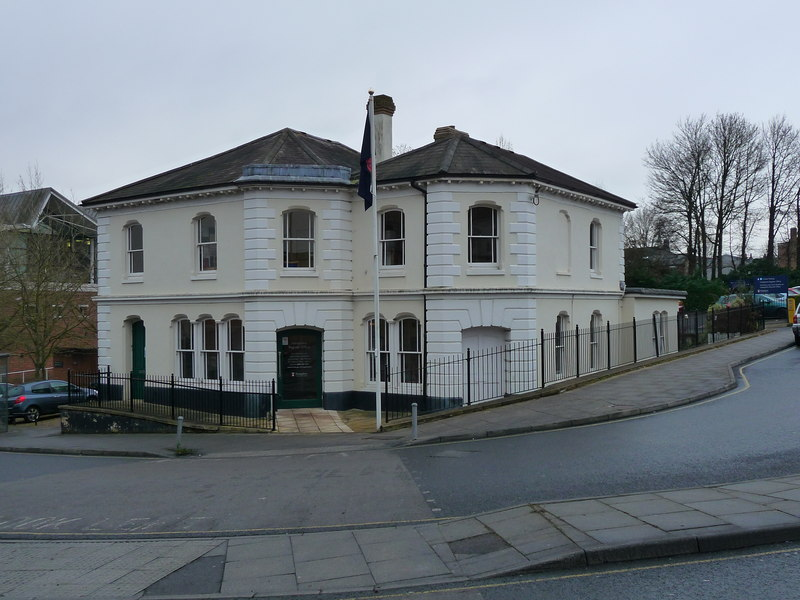
Brown was landlord of the South Western Inn (building pictured in 2010)

Brown coached cricket at the Royal Military College, Sandhurst. He later became a publican in Winchester, where he was landlord of the South Western Inn. In 1935 he was charged with serving alcohol after-hours, but was found not guilty. Brown had a son, George, who served as a police officer during the Second World War and was killed in an air raid targeting Southampton on 30 November–1 December 1940; his death was witnessed by Arlott. During the 1950s, Brown was employed as a parking attendant in Winchester, often patrolling wearing his England cricket blazer. In his latter years, he overcame several illnesses which Arlott remarked "only his mighty constitution could have survived".

Brown died in hospital in Winchester on 3 December 1964; in his final days he was regularly visited by Arlott, who had become a close friend. His funeral took place at a Methodist church in the city on 9 December; Arlott read a eulogy. He was cremated and his ashes spread over the County Ground in Southampton in the presence of cricketing peers and family members, including his wife, Mabel, and daughter. Writing in tribute before his death, Arlott opined that "There was never a more zestful, brave, exciting, or variously gifted cricketer than George Brown". In 2005 Brown was included in a list of popular Hampshire cricketers, chosen by the sports journalist Pat Symes.

== Works cited ==
- Allen, David Rayvern (1996). Arlott: The Authorised Biography. New York City: HarperCollins. ISBN 978-0-586-2-1287-5 – via Internet Archive.
- Arlott, John (1982). John Arlott's Book of Cricketers. London: Sphere Books. ISBN 978-0-7221-1277-9 – via Internet Archive.
- Arlott, John (1985). Arlott on Cricket: His Writings on the Game. London: Fontana. ISBN 978-0-0063-7007-9 – via Internet Archive.
- Barlow, W. M. (1900). Official Guide of the Lancashire League. Burnley: John Dixon Ltd.
- Broom, John (2022). Cricket in the First World War. Barnsley: Pen and Sword History. ISBN 978-1-5267-8014-0.
- Frindall, Bill (1989). England Test Cricketers: The Complete Record from 1877. London: Willow. ISBN 978-0-0021-8339-0 – via Internet Archive.
- Jenkinson, Neil (2000). Hampshire County Cricket Club. Marlow, Buckinghamshire: NPI Media Group. ISBN 978-0-7524-1876-6 – via Internet Archive.
- Martin-Jenkins, Christopher (1996). World Cricketers: A Biographical Dictionary. Oxford University Press. ISBN 978-0-1921-0005-4 – via Internet Archive.
- Milton, Howard (1992). Cricket Grounds of Kent. Nottingham: ACS. OCLC 949280131.
- Renshaw, Andrew (2014). Wisden on the Great War: The Lives of Cricket's Fallen 1914-1918. London: A & C Black. ISBN 978-1-4088-3235-6.
- Robertson-Glasgow, R. C. (1943). Cricket Prints: Some Batsmen and Bowlers, 1920–1940. London: T. Werner Laurie Ltd. OCLC 3257334.
- Stimpson, Michael (2018). George Brown: England's Most Complete All-Round Cricketer. Littlemore: Dorch Publications. [ISBN unspecified]
- Thomson, A. A. (1991). Pavilioned in Splendour. London: Pavilion Books. ISBN 978-1-8514-5658-1.
- Williams, Jack (2012). Cricket and England: A Cultural and Social History of Cricket in England Between the Wars. Milton Park: Taylor & Francis. ISBN 978-1-1363-1713-2.
