= Walter Livsey =

English cricketer (1893–1978)

Personal information
- Full name: Walter Herbert Livsey
- Born: 23 September 1893; Todmorden, Yorkshire, England
- Died: 12 September 1978 (aged 84); Merton Park, London, England
- Batting: Right-handed
- Role: Wicket-keeper

Domestic team information
- Years: Team
- 1913–1929: Hampshire

Career statistics
Competition	First-class
Matches	320
Runs scored	4,940
Batting average	15.33
100s/50s	2/11
Top score	110*
Catches/stumpings	382/266
- Source: Cricinfo, 3 June 2008

Walter Herbert Livsey (23 September 1893 – 12 September 1978) was an English professional first-class cricketer who played as a wicket-keeper for Hampshire from 1913 until 1929. Livsey played 320 first-class matches during his career, and was considered one of the greatest keepers of the 1920s. He was born in Todmorden, but moved to Surrey with his parents as a child.

After finding the presence of wicket-keeper Bert Strudwick stopped his progress at Surrey, Livsey opted to pursue a career with Hampshire. Having served his two-year residential qualification period, he replaced Jimmy Stone as their wicket-keeper and played in the 1914 County Championship. After serving in the First World War with the Hampshire Regiment, during which time he played first-class cricket in British India, Livsey returned to the Hampshire side after being demobilised.

Livsey's form in the 1922 season led to his selection as wicket-keeper for the Marylebone Cricket Club's winter tour of South Africa; however, a broken finger in a tour match prevented him from gaining a Test cap. He continued to play for Hampshire until 1929, when ill-health led to his retirement. He took 382 catches and made 266 stumpings during his career. After retiring, Livsey coached at Epsom College, before working as a groundsman at Rutlish School between 1950 and 1970. He died on 12 September 1978 in Merton Park.

== Early life ==
Walter Herbert Livsey was born in Todmorden, Yorkshire, and was registered at birth as Walter Herbert Livesey, though he would use Livsey for the rest of his life. When he was a child, his parents moved to Surrey. In his teens, he joined the staff at The Oval as a wicket-keeper, but the presence of England wicket-keeper Bert Strudwick limited his opportunities of playing in the Surrey first team. As a result, he was persuaded to move to Hampshire to begin his cricketing career.

== Cricket career ==
=== Early career and war service ===
Livsey spent two years qualifying to play in the County Championship through residency; due to the qualification rules of the time, a player had to be resident in the county he wished to represent for two years. He could play in friendly matches during the qualification period, and thus made his first-class debut for Hampshire against Oxford University at Southampton on 30 June 1913. He performed well as wicket-keeper in the match, conceding only three byes in Oxford's first innings of 554. Livsey completed his qualification period ahead of the 1914 season, and succeeded Jimmy Stone as Hampshire's wicket-keeper. He made his County Championship debut against Leicestershire, and made 26 further appearances in the Championship in 1914. Although he only scored 125 runs at an average of 7.35, as wicket-keeper he took 37 catches and made 23 stumpings. According to Wisden, he caused "quite a sensation" when he stumped Surrey's Jack Hobbs from a sharply lifting ball wide of leg stump delivered by Alec Kennedy.

With the outbreak of the First World War in August, the season was truncated when the Marylebone Cricket Club (MCC) President Francis Lacey confirmed the cessation of cricket during the war, and first-class cricket in England remained suspended until 1919. Livsey enlisted in the war with the 5th Battalion, Hampshire Regiment, alongside other players from Hampshire. Holding the rank of private, he spent most of the war serving in British India, where he played three first-class matches. The first came in December 1915 for an English XII against an Indian XII at the Bombay Gymkhana, in a match that was organised to raise funds on behalf of the Women's Branch of the Bombay Presidency War and Relief Fund. His second match came for the Maharaja of Cooch-Behar's XI against an XI of the Governor of the Bengal Presidency at Calcutta – the game, scheduled for only two days, was also played for charity. His third match came at the Bombay Gymkhana in November 1918, ten days after the signing of the Armistice of 11 November that ended hostilities; the match, termed a "Victory Test" (though it did not hold Test status), was played to raise money for the Indian Famine Relief Fund.

=== Post-war resumption ===
Livsey was not demobilised in time to take part in the 1919 English season, with his wicket-keeping duties at Hampshire being deputised by Sydney Maartensz and George Brown. He returned in 1920 to a Hampshire team that had been greatly weakened by the deaths of several players. Livsey made 26 appearances in the 1920 County Championship, scoring 285 runs at 12.95; he recorded his first half-century against Worcestershire in May, with an unbeaten 50 runs in Hampshire's second innings, having also scored an unbeaten 41 earlier in the match. Keeping-wicket, he took 23 catches and made 26 stumpings across the season. He made 29 appearances the following season, scoring 471 runs at 15.19, with a highest score of 70 not out against Worcestershire; he made this batting at number eleven, and established a Hampshire record tenth wicket partnership of 192 runs with Alex Bowell, a record which remains as of 2026. He took 48 catches and made 32 stumpings across all his matches in 1921, with his 76 dismissals in the County Championship more than any other wicket-keeper.

In the 1922 County Championship, Livsey played in an unlikely victory by 155 runs against Warwickshire at Edgbaston in June. Hampshire were dismissed for 15 runs in their first innings and were forced to follow on 228 runs behind; Livsey was one of eight batsmen to be dismissed without scoring. They performed better in the second innings, making 521 runs; he scored his maiden first-class century, making an unbeaten 110 runs, and shared in a partnership of 177 runs for the ninth wicket with Brown, which was made in only 140 minutes. Across the season, Livsey scored 348 runs at 14.50 from 31 matches, and took 35 catches and made 22 stumpings. For the second successive season, he was the leading wicket-keeper in county cricket in 1922. He played twice for the Players in the Gentlemen versus Players fixtures at Lord's in July, and at the Scarborough Festival in September; as a paid professional he represented the Players, in contrast to unpaid amateurs who played for the Gentlemen.

In July 1922, Livsey was invited to join the MCC's winter tour of South Africa. (Note: The MCC held the responsibility of organising overseas tours from 1903 to 1977. All matches on a tour were played as MCC, except for Test matches, where the side played as England.) He fractured his index finger in September, but this did not affect his selection. On the journey to South Africa, he suffered from seasickness and shortly after arriving he became ill. He then broke his middle finger in a warm-up match against North Eastern Districts, ruling him out from playing on the tour. His place in the Test side as wicket-keeper was taken by his Hampshire teammate Brown. In the 1923 English season, he took 38 catches and made 21 stumpings from 30 matches, and scored 247 runs at 9.14. Following the 1923 season, Livsey travelled to South Africa to coach at Potchefstroom. Returning to England, he made 29 appearances during the 1924 season, scoring 369 runs at 12.72, and taking 21 catches and stumpings apiece. The following season, his 27 matches yielded 425 runs at 15.74, with his wicket-keeping returns being 28 catches and 26 stumpings. During the 1926 season, he recorded his highest run-scoring aggregate for a season, with 562 from 29 matches, averaging 19.37 and scoring two half-centuries. He also took 34 catches and made 18 stumpings.

=== Career twilight ===
Livsey bettered his 1926 run-scoring aggregate during the 1927 season, scoring 615 runs at 20.50 from 27 matches, the first time in his career that his average had surpassed 20. His wicket-keeping yielded 29 catches and 13 stumpings. In June, he played for the South for the first time in the North versus South Test trial fixture at Sheffield. He later played in two further Test trials for England against The Rest at Bristol in July, and at Lord's in August. Livsey also appeared for the Players in the Gentlemen versus Players fixture at The Oval in early July. He had his most successful season with the bat in 1928, scoring 896 at an average of 22.97 from 31 matches; he scored his second career century, making an unbeaten 109 runs against Kent at Dover in June, an innings that spanned 85 minutes. As wicket-keeper, he took 38 catches and made 29 stumpings. In the season-ending Bournemouth Cricket Week, he played in the Gentlemen versus Players and North versus South fixtures. In the 1929 season, he made 29 appearances, all for Hampshire. He scored 556 runs at 13.56, alongside 44 catches and 30 stumpings; the Hampshire Advertiser remarked that Livsey kept-wicket in a "masterly fashion", after claiming seven victims against Warwickshire in June. He was afforded a benefit match against Surrey in June, raising £750.

Livsey suffered a breakdown in his health prior to the beginning of the 1930 season, initially ruling him out for the first part of it, and did not recover sufficiently to play during the remainder of the season. He retired in December 1930, when he accepted a coaching post at Epsom College in succession to the recently deceased James Seymour.

== Playing style and statistics ==
Livsey made 320 appearances in first-class cricket. Primarily as wicket-keeper, he was considered by the cricket historians John Arlott, Victor Isaacs, and Peter Wynne-Thomas to have been one of the greatest wicket-keepers of the 1920s. He took 382 catches and made 266 stumpings across his career. Amongst Hampshire wicket-keepers, Livsey has the fourth-highest number of victims for the county with 626, while his 255 stumpings are the most for Hampshire. 40.8% of his career victims were stumpings; by comparison, the Leicestershire wicket-keeper Tom Sidwell, his Test rival in 1922, took 19%.

Livsey batted in the lower-order, often when quick run-scoring was required; the Hampshire Telegraph noted that on many occasions he had "batted splendidly" when runs were needed at a critical moment in the match. Arlott would later write that Livsey was a nervous batsman. He scored 4,940 runs in his first-class career, while for Hampshire he scored 4,818 runs at average of 15.44, making 11 half-centuries alongside his two centuries. Across his whole career he was not out on 137 occasions.

== Personal life ==
During his playing career, Livsey was butler to his county captain, The Hon. Lionel Tennyson (subsequently Lord Tennyson). In September 1936, Livsey was fined £10 after refusing to get off a crowded bus in Wimbledon, and becoming involved in an altercation with the police. He was appointed an honorary life member of Hampshire County Cricket Club in 1950, alongside several other former professionals. In the same year, he was employed as a groundsman at Rutlish School in Merton Park, a post he held until 1970. Livsey died in Merton Park on 12 September 1978.

== Works cited ==
- Arlott, John (1985). Arlott on Cricket: His Writings on the Game. London: Fontana. ISBN 978-0-0063-7007-9 – via Internet Archive.
- Broom, John (2022). Cricket in the First World War. Barnsley: Pen and Sword History. ISBN 978-1-5267-8014-0.
- Frindall, Bill (1989). England Test Cricketers: The Complete Record from 1877. London: Willow. ISBN 978-0-0021-8339-0 – via Internet Archive.
- Jenkinson, Neil (2000). Hampshire County Cricket Club. Marlow, Buckinghamshire: NPI Media Group. ISBN 978-0-7524-1876-6 – via Internet Archive.
- Odendaal, André; Parry, Richard (2022). Swallows and Hawke. Worthing: Pitch Publishing. ISBN 978-1-8015-0285-6.
- Raiji, Vasant (1989). C.K. Nayudu, the Shahenshah of Indian Cricket. Mumbai: Marine Sports. ISBN 978-8-1853-6100-0.
- Pollard, Jack (1994). The Glovemen: The World's Best Wicket-keepersfirst. London: Hale. ISBN 978-0-8641-7556-4 – via Internet Archive.
- Renshaw, Andrew (2014). Wisden on the Great War: The Lives of Cricket's Fallen 1914-1918. London: A & C Black. ISBN 978-1-4088-3235-6.
- Williams, Jack (2012). Cricket and England: A Cultural and Social History of Cricket in England Between the Wars. Milton Park: Taylor & Francis. ISBN 978-1-1363-1713-2.
- Wynne-Thomas, Peter; Arlott, John; Isaacs, Victor (1988). The History of Hampshire County Cricket Club. London: Helm. ISBN 978-0-7470-0001-3.
