= George Street (cricketer) =

English cricketer

Personal information
- Full name: George Benjamin Street
- Born: 6 December 1889; Charlwood, Surrey, England
- Died: 24 April 1924 (aged 34); Portslade, Sussex, England
- Batting: Right-handed
- Role: Wicket-keeper

International information
- National side: England
- Only Test (cap 212): 18 January 1923 v South Africa

Domestic team information
- Years: Team
- 1909–1923: Sussex
- 1922/23: Marylebone Cricket Club (MCC)

Career statistics
Competition	Tests	FC
Matches	1	197
Runs scored	11	3984
Batting average	11.00	17.24
100s/50s	0/0	1/12
Top score	7*	109
Balls bowled	–	105
Wickets	–	3
Bowling average	–	22.00
5 wickets in innings	–	0
10 wickets in match	–	0
Best bowling	–	3/26
Catches/stumpings	0/1	310/119
- Source: CricketArchive, 17 December 2008

George Benjamin Street (6 December 1889 – 24 April 1924) was an English cricketer who played in one Test in 1923. For his domestic side Sussex he was their regular wicket-keeper from 1912, when he succeeded Harry Butt, until his death.

== Cricket career ==
Born in Charlwood, Surrey, Street made his first-class debut in 1909 against Cambridge University scoring 4 not out, batting at 10, and taking two catches. He played five university matches in three seasons before he made his County Championship debut against Somerset in 1912.

Street scored his maiden half-century against Gloucestershire later that season, batting at 10 he made 72 in a ninth wicket stand of 131 with Percy Fender. This was Street's only fifty in eighty pre-war first-class matches.

In 1921 Street scored his maiden century with an innings of 109 against Essex, sharing in a 141 run partnership with Vallance Jupp. Street scored two fifties to finish the 1921 season with 617 runs at an average 21.27, the highest average of his career.

Having previously been a lower-order batsman, Street was given the chance to open the innings for much of the 1922 season. This opportunity enabled him to amass his highest seasonal aggregate of 986 runs; he also took 81 dismissals.

Although not originally in the squad for the tour of South Africa in 1922-23, he was summoned when Walter Livsey broke a finger against North Eastern Districts. Livsey's deputy George Brown played in the first two Tests of the series before Street got his chance in the Third Test at Durban. He scored 4 in the first innings and 7 not out in the second innings (when chosen to open), he took one stumping off the bowling of county teammate Jupp. Brown was preferred for the final two Tests.

Street took a county record 95 dismissals in the 1923 season, and according to his Wisden obituary "he was at his best". However this would be his final season.

== Death ==
In April 1924 Street was killed in a road accident. According to Wisden, "He was riding a motor-cycle and, in endeavouring to avoid a lorry at a cross-roads, crashed into a wall and died immediately." Street was riding on the main road from Hove where he had attended a boys' football match. A brewery firm's lorry had come toward a junction, sounding its horn continuously. Street, who was driving "too fast", "reached the cross-roads, swerved, accelerated the speed and dashed into a wall". He fractured his skull. The lorry was stationary when Street passed it, and Street had more than half of the road to himself. An inquest returned a verdict of accidental death.
