= Jack Mercer (cricketer) =

English cricketer

Personal information
- Full name: John Mercer
- Born: 22 April 1893; Southwick, Sussex, England
- Died: 31 August 1987 (aged 94); Westminster, London, England
- Batting: Right-handed
- Bowling: Right-arm fast-medium

Domestic team information
- Years: Team
- 1947: Northamptonshire
- 1926/27: Marylebone Cricket Club
- 1923–1930: Wales
- 1922–1939: Glamorgan
- 1919–1921: Sussex

Career statistics
Competition	FC
Matches	457
Runs scored	6,076
Batting average	11.77
100s/50s	–/10
Top score	72
Balls bowled	90,364
Wickets	1,591
Bowling average	23.40
5 wickets in innings	104
10 wickets in match	17
Best bowling	10/51
Catches/stumpings	144/–
- Source: CricketArchive, 27 June 2010

John Mercer (22 April 1893 – 31 August 1987) was the main bowler for Glamorgan in their early years in the County Championship. He bowled medium pace and could swing the ball both ways, whilst when wickets were affected by rain he was able to get on a good deal of off-break. He suffered during his career from Glamorgan's lack of agile, athletic fieldsmen, which meant he was often plagued by dropped catches – otherwise his figures would have been much better. On occasions, he was a dangerous tail-end batsman, who once hit Wilfred Rhodes for 36 runs from 3 overs and hit Dick Howorth for 31 runs off an eight-ball over in his last season with Glamorgan. John Arlott said of him, "he bowled more overs, conceded more runs, took more wickets, scored the fastest 50, made more ducks and was not out more often than anyone else in the county's history".

== Career ==
=== Beginnings ===
Mercer was born in Southwick, West Sussex, and began his cricket with Sussex after World War I in 1919. He found he had very little opportunity because Sussex had so many medium-pace bowlers of similar type on their professional staff, notably Maurice Tate and the Relf brothers. Mercer got a bit of bowling in 1920 but his lack of opportunities in 1921 led him to qualify for the newly promoted first-class county Glamorgan.

=== 100 wickets ===
He started slowly, but by 1925 – when Glamorgan's utterly abysmal batting caused them to suffer a record number of defeats in the Championship – he was a well-established bowler and took over 100 wickets for the first time.

=== Awards ===
The following year, with Glamorgan's batting much improved, the county rose to eighth and Mercer's superb bowling – highlighted by eight for 39 against Gloucestershire and the dismissal of Somerset for 59 and 77 on a sticky wicket at Cardiff Arms Park – put him in second place in the averages and won him a Cricketer of the Year nomination from Wisden in a year when an Ashes tour intensified competition for the honour.

=== Touring ===
Mercer then went on tours of India and Ceylon without doing anything spectacular, and in 1927 when pitches were almost always soft and wet (often so much so as to be really easy for batting) he did not do as well as expected until late in the season. However, in 1929 with fourteen for 119 against the touring South Africans, Mercer perhaps justified those who wondered why he was always overlooked for representative cricket.

=== 1929-1937 ===
In this season, he claimed a personal best 145 wickets, but strains in his thigh caused a gradual decline during the early 1930s and Mercer did not even take 50 wickets in 1934. However, 1935 and 1936 saw him back at his very best, with the latter season seeing him take all ten wickets in an innings at New Road, Worcester and twelve wickets for 123 against Leicestershire. He finished the season with 116 wickets when no other Glamorgan bowler exceeded 46, but in 1937 he lost so much form that he was in and out of the team. Ordinarily, Glamorgan would have ended Mercer's contract, but the erratic availability of their best bowlers meant he stayed with them for another two years, during which he produced his famous hitting spree against Worcestershire at Cardiff when Glamorgan were faced with certain defeat (the weather saved them).

=== 1939 onwards ===
During 1939, Glamorgan announced Mercer would not be retained for 1940, but war brought an end to county cricket until 1946. Mercer then took up an appointment as coach of Northamptonshire, and even played one match for them at the extraordinary age of fifty-four. Mercer's vitality was shown by the fact that he lived to the age of ninety-four, dying in Westminster in 1987.
