= Phil Mead =

English cricketer (1887–1958)

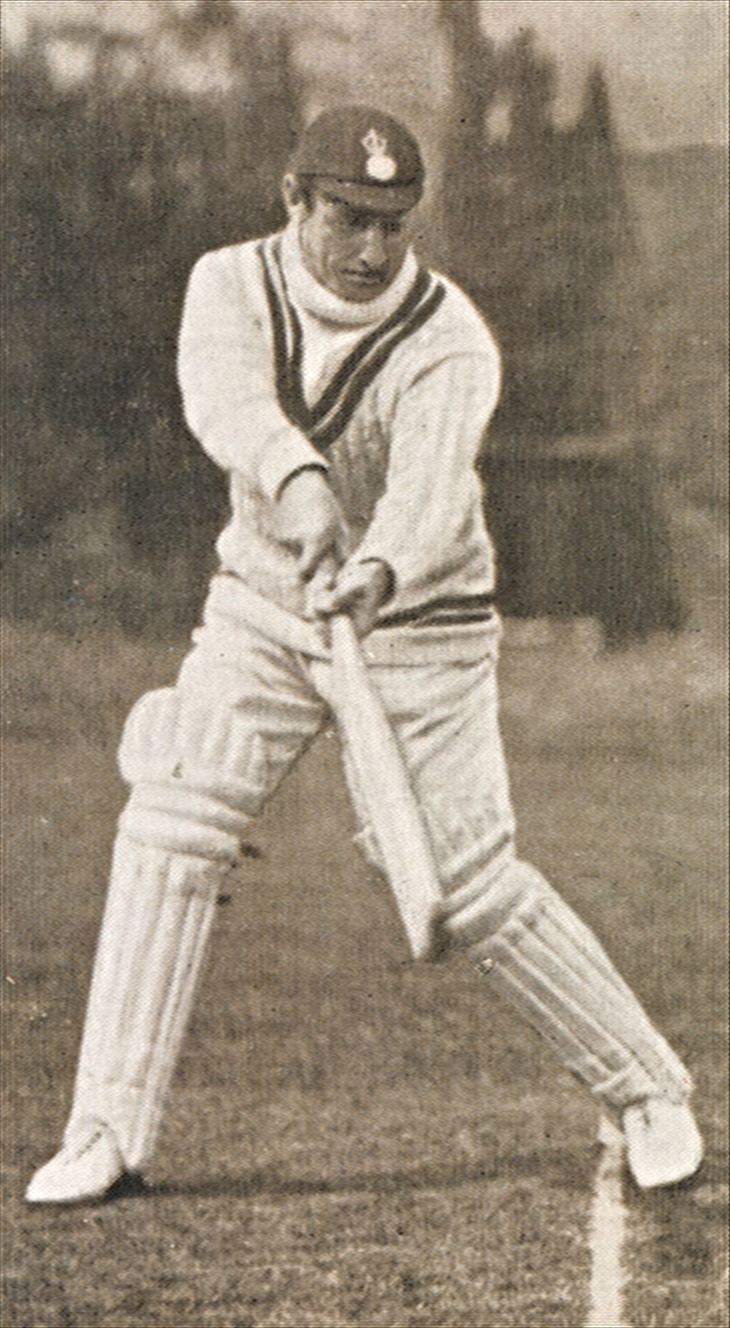

Personal information
- Full name: Charles Philip Mead
- Born: 9 March 1887; Battersea, London, England
- Died: 26 March 1958 (aged 71); Boscombe, Hampshire, England
- Batting: Left-handed
- Bowling: Slow left-arm orthodox

International information
- National side: England
- Test debut (cap 174): 15 December 1911 v Australia
- Last Test: 30 November 1928 v Australia

Domestic team information
- Years: Team
- 1905–1936: Hampshire
- 1910–1929: Marylebone Cricket Club
- 1938–1939: Suffolk

Career statistics
Competition	Test	First-class
Matches	17	814
Runs scored	1,185	55,061
Batting average	49.37	47.67
100s/50s	4/3	153/258
Top score	182*	280*
Balls bowled	–	18,457
Wickets	–	277
Bowling average	–	34.70
5 wickets in innings	–	5
10 wickets in match	–	0
Best bowling	–	7/18
Catches/stumpings	4/–	675/–
- Source: Cricinfo, 3 January 2010
Association football career
- Position: Goalkeeper
Senior career*
Years	Team	Apps	(Gls)
1907	Southampton	1	(0)
- * Club domestic league appearances and goals

Charles Phillip Mead (9 March 1887 – 26 March 1958) was an English professional cricketer who played in seventeen Test matches for England and had an extensive domestic career with Hampshire in English county cricket, spanning 31 years. Mead was born in Battersea. Overlooked by Surrey, he joined Hampshire in 1903 and made his debut for the county in first-class cricket in 1905. He established himself in the Hampshire team as a left-handed batsman the following season. After passing 2,000 runs in a season for the first time in 1911, Mead was chosen as one of five Wisden Cricketers of the Year. He was subsequently selected to tour Australia in 1911–12, making his Test debut against Australia. After success in the 1912 season, he toured South Africa, scoring his first Test century during the tour. Mead's appearances at Test level were infrequent, spanning seventeen matches across five series between 1911 and 1928. He scored nearly 1,200 runs in Tests, making four centuries. The paucity of his appearances at Test level were attributed to hostility toward his status as a professional batsman by England captain Plum Warner, playing for an "unfashionable" county, and an abundance of strong batsmen in county cricket competing for limited spaces in the England team. Despite the end of his Test career in 1928, Mead continued to play first-class cricket until 1936, when he was released by Hampshire at the age of 49. He then played two seasons of minor counties cricket for Suffolk in 1938 and 1939, whilst employed as a cricket coach at Framlingham College.

Mead holds many batting records. He is the fourth-highest run-scorer in first-class cricket, having scored over 55,000 runs during his career. He holds the record for the most runs in the County Championship, while his 2,843 runs in the 1928 County Championship constitutes an all-time record for a single season. He also made 153 first-class centuries during his career, the fourth-highest number by a batsman. His number of runs for Hampshire (48,892) is the greatest number any batsman has scored for a single first-class team. He also exceeded a thousand runs in every season of first-class cricket except his first – when he only played one match.

In later life, problems with his eyes which had begun in 1942 led to Mead becoming totally blind by August 1946. He retired to Bournemouth, where he died in hospital in March 1958, following an operation for internal bleeding.

== Early life ==
Mead was born in at 10 Ashton Buildings in Battersea on 9 March 1887, the second eldest of seven children. His talents as a cricketer were first spotted as a schoolboy at Shillington Street School, scoring his first century as a ten-year-old while playing in the South London School League. He also played for the combined London Schools team. He was spotted playing in a school's match at The Oval by C. B. Fry, who encouraged him to pursue cricket as a profession. Mead joined the staff at Surrey in 1902, aged 15, primarily as a slow left-arm orthodox bowler. While trying to establish his career, he worked in a shop in the West End of London. Mead left Surrey in 1903 after he was not offered a contract at the end of that season, having been unable to force his way into the powerful Surrey team of the time.

== Cricket career ==
=== Early years at Hampshire ===
A fortnight after Mead was released, Surrey attempted to reverse their decision by offering him a contract. However, he had been to Hampshire for a trial and decided to sign a two-year contract with them; Fry assisted him in securing a contract by persuading one of Hampshire's financial backers, Charles Hoare, to provide him with a job whilst he undertook his two-year residency qualification to represent Hampshire in the County Championship. Hoare provided him with employment at his training establishment Mercury, where Mead coached naval trainees during his qualification period. Aged 17, he nearly made his debut in first-class cricket for the Players of the South against the Gentlemen of the South at Bournemouth, but his inclusion was vetoed by W. G. Grace who objected because of his age. He made his first-class debut for Hampshire in 1905, against the touring Australians at Southampton. He showed his skill against fast bowling in this match, particularly against that of Tibby Cotter, by scoring 41 runs.

After qualifying in 1905, he immediately established himself in Hampshire's County Championship team in 1906. He opened the batting on his Championship debut against Surrey, but was dismissed for scores of 0 and 3. In the following match against Yorkshire, he batted from the middle order and scored his maiden first-class century, making 109 runs in Hampshire's second innings, having made 60 runs in their first. In his first full season, he passed a thousand runs for the season (a feat he repeated for the next 27 consecutive seasons) with 1,014 at an average of 26.68, and made a further century. His slow left-arm orthodox bowling was used by Hampshire in 1906, with Mead taking 22 wickets at a bowling average of 35.36, claiming his maiden five-wicket haul (5 for 62) against Warwickshire. He began to regularly open the batting in 1907, alongside Alex Bowell. Mead scored 1,190 runs from 25 matches in 1907, but only managed to record a single century. He had his most successful season as a bowler in the 1907 season, taking 42 wickets at an average of 26.40, taking five wickets in an innings twice.

Mead played the same number of matches the following season, scoring 1,118 runs and making two centuries. He took a further 27 wickets at an average of 34.62, taking his career best figures of 7 for 18 against Northamptonshire, where bowling first change he helped to dismiss Northamptonshire for 60 runs in their second innings, with Hampshire winning the match by 9 wickets. In 1908, he played for a Hambledon XII in a commemorative first-class match against an England XI at Broadhalfpenny Down. Mead scored 1,459 runs at an average of 37.41 from 24 matches in the wet summer of 1909, in addition to taking 23 wickets at an average of 35.43; as his reputation as a batsman grew, he began to take his bowling less seriously and as a result, was used less. In 1910, he scored 1,416 runs at an average of 31.46, making one century. Three of his first-class matches came for teams besides Hampshire. He played for the Marylebone Cricket Club (MCC) against Nottinghamshire at the beginning of the season, and for the East of England against the West of England in June, before being selected for The Rest against 1910 County Champions Kent at The Oval; in the latter match, he was described as having "batted brilliantly" by the Bournemouth Daily Echo.

=== Test debut ===
Mead was prolific during the 1911 season, having dropped down to the upper-middle order. He scored over 2,562 runs at an average of 54.51 from 29 matches, making nine centuries. Against Leicestershire in June, he scored two centuries in the same match, making 100 and an unbeaten 109 runs, in addition to scoring a maiden double-century, an unbeaten 207 runs against Warwickshire in August, with Mead sharing in a 292 runs partnership for the third wicket with Alexander Johnston. The following month, whilst playing for the Players in the Gentlemen versus Players match at the Scarborough Festival in September, he made a second double-century (223 runs). He was Hampshire's leading run-scorer in the County Championship that season, with 1,706 runs at an average of 58.82. Overall, he ranked fourth behind Tom Hayward, Jack Sharp and David Denton, despite Mead having played at least ten fewer innings than them. Strengthened by his century for The Rest in the season ending match against County Champion's Warwickshire at The Oval, his form led him to be selected for the MCC's 1911–12 tour of Australia. (Note: The Marylebone Cricket Club (MCC) held the responsibility of organising overseas tours from 1903 to 1977. All matches on a tour were played as MCC, except for Test matches, where the team played as England.) Under the captaincy of Plum Warner, it was considered the strongest touring team that had been sent to Australia at the time. As a result of his performances in 1911, Mead was named one of Wisden's Five Cricketers of the Year.

Having played in the five first-class matches against Australian state and representative teams that preceded the First Test, Mead made his Test debut for England against Australia at the Sydney Cricket Ground, being dismissed for a 16–ball duck by H. V. Hordern in his first Test innings. He played in all five Test matches, but had success only in the Third Test at Adelaide, where he shared in a partnership of 63 runs for the fifth wicket with Jack Hobbs, with Mead's contribution being 46 runs. Writing in The Cricketer in 1990, Peter Coulson considered Mead's contributions to England's 4–1 series victory to be "meagre", with John Arlott having written in 1980 that he was "one of the failures of a winning side". His best performance on the tour came in a first-class match against Tasmania, where he made a score of 98 runs. Following the series, in an anonymous letter to The Times, Warner was critical of Mead's batting. Warner's hostility toward Mead, which remained for the rest of his career, was attributed to Mead's status as a professional batsman, when traditionally it was amateurs that batted and professionals that bowled. The infrequency of his Test appearances thereafter has been attributed not only to Warner's hostility, but also to playing for a county perceived as "unfashionable", and having to compete with an abundance of strong batsmen for limited places in the Test team, notably Frank Woolley who was preferred over Mead.

Upon his return home, Mead had a successful season in 1912, scoring 1,933 runs at an average of 50.86 from 34 matches; he scored seven centuries during the season. His highest score of the season, an unbeaten 160, contributed to Hampshire's first-ever victory against the Australians at Southampton in July. In his first match of the season, Mead had played for The Rest against England in the Test trial match at The Oval in early May. He did not have success in the match, making scores of 1 and 17. Later in May, he played for the MCC against the Australians and for The Rest against the MCC Australian Touring Team, and despite his good form for Hampshire, he was not chosen to take part in the 1912 Triangular Tournament. Mead's success continued into the 1913 season, in which he scored 2,267 runs at an average of 50.51. In 32 first-class matches that season, he scored nine centuries. He again recorded two centuries against Leicestershire in the same match during the season, making scores of 102 and 113 not out at Southampton. In terms of runs scored in the 1913 County Championship, Mead (2,146 runs) was second behind Hobbs (2,238 runs), whilst in overall first-class cricket he topped the national batting averages in that year. He was subsequently chosen for the winter tour of South Africa with the MCC, this time led by Johnny Douglas.

Mead played all five Test matches in the tour's itinerary, scoring a maiden Test century (102 runs) in the Second Test at Johannesburg, before following up with a second century (117 runs) in the Fifth Test at Port Elizabeth. In the series, which England won 4–0, Mead was said to have "scored solidly", scoring 745 runs in the sixteen tour matches, placing his aggregate third behind Hobbs and Douglas; in the Test matches, his average of exactly 54 was second to Hobbs' 63.28. In the 1914 season, which was truncated in August by the outbreak of the First World War, Mead and Hampshire had success. Playing in 31 first-class matches that season, he scored 2,476 runs at an average of 51.58, recording seven centuries. Against Yorkshire in May, he scored 213 runs and shared in a fifth wicket partnership of 170 runs with Gerald Harrison. Hampshire achieved a fifth-placed finish in the 1914 County Championship, their highest championship finish to that point, with Wisden describing Mead as 'a tower of strength' in the Hampshire batting order. With the MCC President Francis Lacey confirming the cessation of cricket during the war, first-class cricket in England was suspended until 1919. Having initially enlisted in September 1914 with the 5th Battalion, Hampshire Regiment, Mead was rejected from active service during the conflict because of varicose veins, along with other medical issues. During the war, he played for Frank Hopkins Hampshire Club and Ground team against a Royal Garrison Artillery team.

=== Post-war career ===
After the conclusion of the war, Mead returned to a Hampshire team that had been greatly weakened by the deaths of several pre-war players in the conflict. Upon the resumption of first-class cricket in 1919, Mead began the season by hitting an unbeaten 91 against the Australian Imperial Forces at Southampton. Across the season, his 23 matches yielded him 1,720 runs at an average of 55.48, topping Hampshire's batting averages, and scoring three centuries. Amongst these was the third double-century of his career, a score of 207 against Essex at Leyton. In November 1919, the Hampshire committee afforded Mead a benefit for the following season. In 1920, Mead scored 1,887 runs at an average of 49.65 from 24 matches, making six centuries. Following the 1920 season, Mead became seriously ill with pneumonia to the extent where doctors had "given up" on him surviving. However, he recovered and had his most successful season in county cricket in 1921, when he passed 3,000 runs in a season for the first time. In 33 matches, he scored 3,179 runs at an average of 69.10, heading the national first-class averages. For Hampshire, he made scores of 224 and 113 in the match against Sussex at Horsham, and an unbeaten 280 against Nottinghamshire at Southampton. In the same year, he shared in a Hampshire record partnership for the fourth wicket of 259 runs with Lionel Tennyson.

Mead's form led to his recall to the England team for the second match of their Test series against Australia. However, he was ruled out of playing in the Test having injured his hand three days prior in a County Championship match against Lancashire. He was subsequently recalled for the Third Test in place of Patsy Hendren, though despite his selection, he did not play in the final eleven. Up to that point in the series, the Australian fast bowlers Jack Gregory and Ted McDonald had dominated the English batsmen, establishing a 3–0 lead for the Australians. Picked in the team for the drawn Fourth Test at Old Trafford, Mead made 47 runs in his only innings. In the Fifth Test at the Oval, Mead made an unbeaten 182 runs in England's first innings total of 403 for 8 declared. His innings, which spanned over five hours, was described as one of "non-stop defence". His score was the highest by an English batsman against Australia in England, a record which remained until 1938 when Eddie Paynter scored 216.

His success continued the following season, with Mead scoring 2,391 runs at an average of 59.77; he made eight centuries during the season, including another two double-centuries against Warwickshire and Worcestershire. He was a member of the Hampshire team that played in the County Championship match against Warwickshire, where Hampshire were dismissed for 15 runs in their first innings, but subsequently went on to win the match by 155 runs, having been forced to follow-on 228 runs behind; Mead top-scored with an unbeaten 6 runs in the first innings. Mead was bemused by Hampshire's collapse, commenting "nobody bowled me anything I couldn't play in the middle". He was chosen for the winter tour to South Africa, playing in all five Test matches during the series, which England won 2–1. In the Third Test at Durban, he made 181 runs, after four of the first five batsmen had made only 41 runs between them. His innings occupied eight hours and 20 minutes, and was remarked to have to have been characteristic in its "untiring defence". He made a half century (66 runs) in the Fifth Test, also played at Durban, and finished the Test series as England's second leading run-scorer with 392 runs, behind Jack Russell's aggregate of 436 runs.

Mead ended the 1923 season second in the national first-class averages, behind Hendren. In 32 matches, Mead scored 2,604 runs at an average of 59.18, making seven centuries. His highest score in 1923 was a double century (222 runs) against Warwickshire. His batting average dropped the following season to 42.15, with 1,644 runs from 29 matches. His average rose in 1925 to 47.36, scoring 1,942 runs from 29 matches. Amongst his four centuries in 1925 was an unbeaten 213 in July against Worcestershire in the County Championship. Mead scored over two-thousand runs in 1926, with 2,326 at an average of 62.86, making ten centuries. During the season against Kent in the County Championship, he established a Hampshire record for the seventh wicket with John Parker of 270 runs, with Mead scoring 175 runs in Hampshire's second innings. Mead achieved the best batting average of his career (74.53) in 1927, having scored 2,385 runs and made eight centuries, including an unbeaten 200 runs against Essex after Hampshire had been asked to follow-on. During the season, he again established a record partnership for Hampshire, this time alongside George Brown for the third wicket against Yorkshire, with the pair putting on 344 runs; Mead's contribution to Hampshire's first innings was 183 runs. The season was notable for Mead scoring his 100th first-class century, a feat achieved against Northamptonshire at Kettering; in recognition of his achievement, Mead was presented with a cheque for 7,613 shillings and a gold watch. He was the first left-hander and the fourth batsman overall to reach the landmark.

Mead was selected in Tennyson's team to tour Jamaica in early 1928, scoring four centuries against Jamaica in the five first-class innings in which he batted on the tour. With 418 runs at an average of 104.50, he topped both the tourists batting aggregates and averages. His highest score on the tour (151 runs) came in the second innings of the third match, with Mead having been absent ill during the first innings.

=== Final Test and later first-class career ===
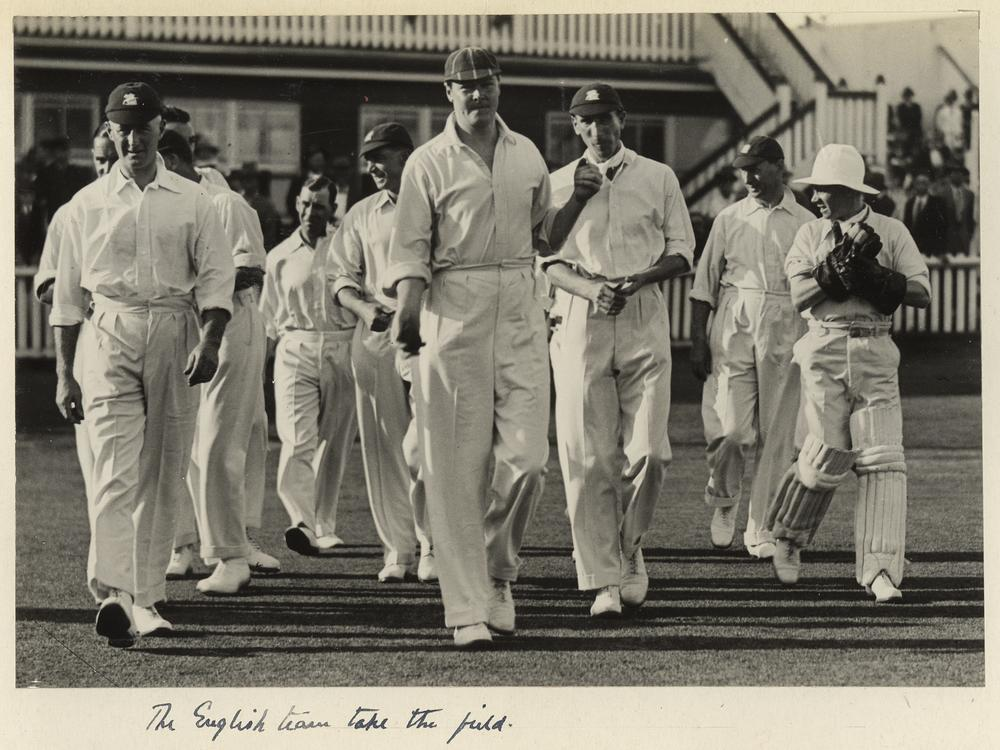
Phil Mead (second from right) walks out to field in his final Test match, played at Brisbane in 1928

Far from declining as he aged, as some had expected, Mead continued to score heavily. He made 3,027 runs at an average of 75.67 from 30 matches in 1928, making thirteen centuries during the season. His total of 2,843 runs in the 1928 County Championship remains a record in a County Championship season. It was noted by the Hampshire Telegraph that Hampshire's batting was inconsistent throughout the season, with Mead being the "only batsman who can be relied upon to tackle the opposing attack". On the back of his form, and at the recommendation of Hobbs, he earned a Test recall at the age of 40 when he was selected for the MCC winter tour of Australia. His recall was justified by the MCC in that "he was chosen with the sole object of strengthening the backbone of the batting". Mead played in the First Test match at Brisbane, scoring 8 and 73, after which he was dropped in favour of an additional bowler, George Geary, for the remainder of the series and did not appear in Test cricket again. Having last toured Australia 17 years previously, he is said to have been greeted by a cricket fan with: "Whatcheer, Digger, I remember your father in 1911!"

Mead dislocated his hand against Somerset in May 1929, limiting his appearances that season to 21; despite this, he managed to score 1,733 runs and average 55.90. Amongst his five centuries in 1929 was a score of 233 when playing against Lord Hawke's XI for the MCC Australian Touring Team. In January 1930, the Hampshire committee afforded Mead a second benefit match, against Gloucestershire in June of the forthcoming season. His form declined substantially in 1930, when his average dropped to 29.65, leading some to believe he was past his best. However, his form improved in 1931 and his average rose to 43.13. In 1931, he surpassed W. G. Grace's record of 126 first-class centuries, doing so against Sussex in June. His form again declined in 1932, when his average dropped to 30.25 from 27 matches. He topped Hampshire's batting averages in 1933, scoring 2,576 runs at an average of 67.78 from 27 matches. Nationally, he was second only to Wally Hammond in the batting averages. Amongst his ten centuries in 1933 was his last double century, 227 runs made against Derbyshire whilst captaining Hampshire, in a period when regular captain Lord Tennyson's unavailability led to several players deputising for him.

Mead had further success in 1934, scoring 2,011 runs at an average of 52.92 from 29 matches. Against the Australians that season, Hampshire made 420 all out in their first innings. Mead contributed a century (129 runs), with Don Bradman describing it as "a truly great innings". His top score during the season came against Kent in the County Championship in July, when he fell two runs short of his double century. His average dropped to 38.37 from 30 matches in 1935, before dropping further in 1936 to 33.05 from 26 matches. At the age of 49, the 1936 season was to be Mead's last, with Hampshire opting not to re-engage him for the 1937 season. Arlott opined that both rheumatism and failing eyesight were factors in the decision. In his last innings against Yorkshire, Mead played a skilful 52 against Hedley Verity (who took 6 for 74) on a badly wearing wicket. In contrast to how many retiring professionals of the time were treated, the Hampshire committee decided to pay Mead a wage until September 1937.

=== Minor counties cricket ===
In April 1937, Mead was appointed cricket coach at Framlingham College in Suffolk, and was re-engaged in March 1938. He debuted in minor counties cricket for Suffolk in the 1938 Minor Counties Championship against the Surrey Second XI at Ipswich School. He played minor counties cricket for Suffolk until 1939, making eleven appearances in the Minor Counties Championship. He topped Suffolk's batting averages in both seasons, averaging 76.80 in 1938 and 71.28 in 1939, placing him second overall in the national minor counties averages for 1939. Having finished in third-place in 1939, their best finish for several years, Suffolk's success was credited to the "influence and ability" of Mead.

=== Playing style and statistics ===
When preparing to face a bowler, Mead was known for his thorough routine and predictable mannerisms, with Arlott describing how having got to the crease with his "rolling, self-reliant" walk, he took guard, twirled his bat, tapped his bat in the crease and took several shuffling steps up to it. Before every ball he would tug his cap. His crouch when preparing to face a delivery was said by Wisden to make his batting look less pleasing on the eye, when compared to peers like Woolley. If a bowler attempted to hurry him to face a delivery, Mead would restart his batting preparations, forcing the bowler to wait. Wisden considered him to be a more watchful batsman than his peers, which aided his strong defensive play. Such was the strength of this aspect of his batting, that he was perceived as being a slow scorer. His batting was not slow, but completely unhurried; a spectator once described him as having 'stone-walled' from a quarter to one to half past six scoring 214 runs. He used clever placement of the ball to obtain singles, something that Wisden noted others struggled to do as well; Bill Frindall later wrote how his mastery of memorising field placements aided him in scoring singles. His rate of scoring compared favourably with his contemporaries, with Mead being capable of playing fast-scoring innings, such as in 1911 when he made 194 at under a run-a-minute against Sussex; during his career, he scored four centuries before lunch, demonstrating his ability to score runs quickly.

Mead relied upon good timing of the ball, and was a strong driver of the ball on both the leg-side and off-side, making use of his long arms to reach for the ball and punish any wayward delivery. Arlott later wrote that his cutting and glancing of the ball was "almost unbelievably delicate". His ability cutting the ball sometimes led opposition captains to place two fielders at third-man to negate the shot. This was complemented by his judgement of what balls to leave alone, particularly late-swinging outswingers. His quick-footedness made him a capable batsman against spin bowling. Alec Kennedy and James Langridge, both contemporaries of Mead's, felt that he scored more runs on turning wickets because of his strength against spin bowling.

In a first-class career that spanned 31 years, Mead appeared in 814 matches, scoring 55,061 runs at an average of 47.67. Only Hobbs (61,760), Woolley (58,959), and Hendren (57,611) have scored more. He made over a thousand runs in each season that he played, except for 1905, when he was completing his residency qualification; of these, he scored two thousand runs in a season on nine occasions and three thousand twice. His 153 first-class centuries ranks him fourth on the all-time list, behind Hobbs (199), Hendren (170), and Hammond (167). Alongside his 153 centuries, he also made 258 half centuries. In the County Championship, he scored 46,268 runs, the most in the history of the competition. For Hampshire, Mead made 700 first-class appearances, a record for the county. He scored 48,892 runs for Hampshire, which is the most runs any batsman has scored for a first-class team. His 138 centuries for Hampshire is more than twice the number of Roy Marshall (60), who has the second highest number of centuries for the county. Neither of the partnerships he helped to establish in 1921 and 1927 remain Hampshire records. In addition to playing for Hampshire, Mead played a significant number of matches for the MCC (47), scoring 2,177 runs, and for the Players (18), scoring 988 runs. In Test cricket, Mead made seventeen appearances. In these, he scored 1,185 runs at an average of 49.37.

Early in his career, Mead was utilised as a change bowler. He took 277 wickets at a bowling average of 34.70 in his first-class career. Of these, 266 came for Hampshire, with Mead taking five wickets in an innings for the county on five occasions. A man of large build, Wisden remarked how despite this he was a nimble slip fielder. For Hampshire, he took 663 catches, a record for the county.

== Football career ==
In 1907, Mead signed for Southampton for one season to assist the club's reserve team as an inside-forward, but he had no intention of taking up football as a full-time occupation for longer than a season or two. On 21 December 1907, he was at Fratton Park for a reserve fixture against Portsmouth when he was summoned to The Dell where Southampton had an emergency as both regular goalkeepers, Herbert Lock and Tom Burrows, were unavailable through injury. Mead therefore played in goal in a Southern League match against West Ham United. In his lone first team appearance, he was said to have "shaped up well but was only required to save two shots and kept a blank sheet in a 0–0 draw."

== Personal life and death ==
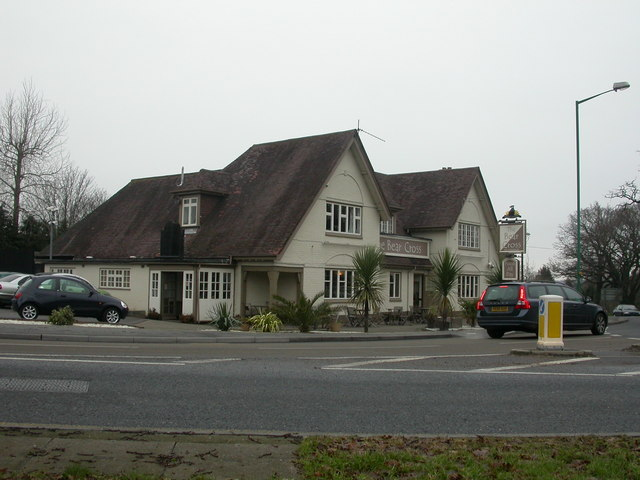
During the mid-1930s, Mead was the landlord of The Bear Cross public house in Winton (pictured in 2010)

Mead married Beatrice Englefield in 1908, with the couple having two sons, Ronald and Frank, and a daughter. His wife's brother, Frank Englefield, was a professional footballer, playing for both Southampton and Fulham. Mead had a variety of business ventures during his life. During his early career prior to the First World War, he entered into a partnership with Walter Toomer, running a sports equipment shop. With Toomer's enlistment in the war, Mead took over the day-to-day running of the business. Following the war, he founded his own cricket bat manufacturer, which was initially successful but then went into receivership. He was landlord of The Bear Cross Inn public house in the Bournemouth suburb of Winton, but by 1936 he had been forced by the brewery to relinquish the pub after it had gone out of business, leaving him and his family homeless for a while. Following this, Mead managed to support himself outside of the cricket season by working as a travelling salesman for Spillers, and selling lightbulbs. He supported himself through these means until he was offered a coaching position at Framlingham College.

Soon after the Second World War, problems with his eyes which had begun with a detached retina in his right eye in 1942 led to Mead becoming totally blind by August 1946, having undergone two operations in an attempt to save the sight in his left eye. After going blind he encountered financial difficulties and received assistance from a fund raised by Herbert Sutcliffe for Mead and Len Braund, that had raised £4,400 by December 1946. He was elected an honorary life member of the MCC in 1949. In retirement, he lived with his daughter in Bournemouth. A stand at the County Ground in Southampton was named after him. In May 1956, he opened a new administrative block at the County Ground, alongside club president Harry Altham. He retained a great interest in cricket and often attended Hampshire matches at Dean Park, despite his blindness, relying upon his hearing to "watch" matches. Having become seriously ill, Mead was admitted to the Royal Victoria Hospital in Boscombe and died there a week later on 26 March 1958, following an operation for internal bleeding. He was buried at Bournemouth North Cemetery on 2 April. His funeral was attended by several cricketing peers, representatives of Hampshire County Cricket Club and attendees from clubs and organisations across Bournemouth.

== Works cited ==
- Arlott, John (1982). John Arlott's Book of Cricketers. London: Sphere Books. ISBN 978-0-7221-1277-9 – via Internet Archive.
- Arlott, John (1986). "Phil Mead". John Arlott's 100 Greatest Batsmen. London: Macdonald. pp. 180–182. ISBN 978-0-356-12365-3 – via Internet Archive.
- Arlott, John (1991). The Essential Arlott on Cricket: Forty Years of Classic Writing on the Game. London: Fontana. ISBN 978-0-0063-7678-1 – via Internet Archive.
- Broom, John (2022). Cricket in the First World War. Barnsley: Pen and Sword History. ISBN 978-1-5267-8014-0.
- Cricket Grounds of Hampshire. Nottingham: ACS. 1988. OCLC 20758890.
- Frindall, Bill (1989). England Test Cricketers: The Complete Record from 1877. London: Willow. ISBN 978-0-0021-8339-0 – via Internet Archive.
- Harfield, Mike; Butcher, Mark (2011). Spirit on the Water: XI Extraordinary Cricket Tours. Chipping Campden: Loose Chippings Books. ISBN 978-0-9554-2179-2.
- Harman, Jo (2017). Cricketing Allsorts: The Good, The Bad, The Ugly (and The Downright Weird). London: Bloomsbury Publishing. ISBN 978-1-4729-4345-3.
- Holley, Duncan; Chalk, Gary (1992). The Alphabet of the Saints. Leicester: ACL & Polar Publishing. ISBN 978-0-9514-8623-8.
- Jenkinson, Neil (1993). C.P. Mead: Hampshire's Greatest Run-maker. Southampton: Paul Cave Publications. ISBN 978-0-8614-6086-1.
- Sandford, Christopher (2014). The Final Over: The Cricketers of Summer 1914. Cheltenham: The History Press. ISBN 978-0-7509-6198-1.
- Stern, John; Williams, Marcus (2013). The Essential Wisden: An Anthology of 150 Years of Wisden Cricketers' Almanack. London: Bloomsbury Publishing. ISBN 978-1-4081-7897-3.
- Sweetman, Simon (2015). Dimming of the Day: The Cricket Season of 1914. Cardiff: ACS. ISBN 978-1-9081-6555-8.
- Thomson, A.A. (1991). Pavilioned in Splendour. London: Pavilion Books. ISBN 978-1-8514-5658-1.
- Williams, Jack (2012). Cricket and England: A Cultural and Social History of Cricket in England Between the Wars. Milton Park: Taylor & Francis. ISBN 978-1-1363-1713-2.
- Wilton, Iain (2002). C.B. Fry: King of Sport. London: Metro. ISBN 978-1-8435-8030-0 – via Internet Archive.
