= Alec Kennedy =

English cricketer (1891 – 1959)

Personal information
- Full name: Alexander Stuart Kennedy
- Born: 24 January 1891; Edinburgh, Midlothian Scotland
- Died: 15 November 1959 (aged 68); Hythe, Hampshire, England
- Batting: Right-handed
- Bowling: Right-arm medium

International information
- National side: England
- Test debut (cap 208): 22 December 1922 v South Africa
- Last Test: 16 February 1923 v South Africa

Domestic team information
- Years: Team
- 1907–1936: Hampshire
- 1919–1934: Marylebone Cricket Club

Career statistics
Competition	Test	First-class
Matches	5	677
Runs scored	93	16,586
Batting average	15.50	18.53
100s/50s	0/0	10/64
Top score	41*	163*
Balls bowled	1,683	150,851
Wickets	31	2,874
Bowling average	19.32	21.23
5 wickets in innings	2	225
10 wickets in match	0	45
Best bowling	5/76	10/37
Catches/stumpings	5/–	531/–
- Source: Cricinfo, 16 December 2020

Alexander Stuart Kennedy (24 January 1891 – 15 November 1959) was a Scottish professional cricketer who played in five Test matches for England and had an extensive domestic career with Hampshire in English county cricket, spanning 29 years. Born in Scotland but raised in England, Kennedy made his debut in first-class cricket for Hampshire in 1907. An all-rounder, he formed a potent bowling partnership with fellow all-rounder Jack Newman that spanned 20 years, with the pair sometimes bowling unchanged throughout both innings of a match. A right-handed batsman and right-arm medium pace bowler, Kennedy developed into one of the most durable and consistent all-rounders in county cricket. As a bowler he was known for his accuracy, and his abilities to bowl inswingers and to turn the ball.

After emerging as an all-rounder following the First World War, Kennedy played five Test matches for England on the Marylebone Cricket Club's 1922–23 tour of South Africa. He was chosen as one of five Wisden Cricketers of the Year for 1934. In 677 first-class matches, he took 2,874 wickets, including 225 five wicket hauls. His career total is the seventh highest in first-class cricket, with his 2,549 wickets for Hampshire second only to Derek Shackleton's 2,669. As a batsman, he scored 16,586 runs making ten centuries. Having started out as a tailend batsman, Kennedy's batting improved as his career progressed that by the early 1920s, he was entrusted with opening the batting.

Following his retirement, Kennedy coached cricket at Cheltenham College and later in South Africa from 1947 to 1954. He died on 15 November 1959, having been unwell for several months.

== Early life ==
Alexander Stuart Kennedy was born in Edinburgh on 24 January 1891. His family left Scotland when he was a young boy, moving south to England where they settled in Southampton. He took an interest in cricket as a child and would bowl in the nets at the County Ground in Southampton. Upon leaving school at the age of 14, he joined the groundstaff at Hampshire alongside Alex Bowell, George Brown, Walter Livsey, Phil Mead, and Jack Newman; together, they formed the first major intake of professional cricketers at Hampshire. Over the following two years, Kennedy would play country house cricket in and around Southampton, most notably for the Brockenhurst Park Estate in the New Forest. During this time, he would be coached by Charlie Llewellyn, learning the bowling skills of flight and length by aiming to pitch the ball on a piece of paper in the nets.

== Cricket career ==
=== Pre-war career ===
At the age of 16, Kennedy made his debut in first-class cricket for Hampshire as a right-arm medium pace bowler against Leicestershire at Aylestone Road in the 1907 County Championship, taking figures of 4 wickets for 33 rusn in Leicestershire's first innings. He made a second appearance that season, against Warwickshire. He played four first-class matches in the 1908 season, claiming his maiden five wicket haul (6 for 41) against the touring Gentlemen of Philadelphia. Kennedy gained a regular place in the Hampshire the following season, making 15 appearances and establishing his bowling partnership with Jack Newman, which was to span two decades and form the backbone of the Hampshire attack. He took 31 wickets in 1909, averaging 21.96 runs per wicket. He made 20 appearances in 1910, taking 31 wickets for the second successive season. In 1911, he bowled nearly twice as many overs as he had in 1910, taking 51 wickets at a bowling average of 30.70 from 23 matches. He claimed five or more wickets in an innings on five occasions. It was during this season that his credentials as an all-rounder began to come to the fore, with Kennedy scoring his first half-century (62 runs) and scoring 545 runs at a batting average of 18.46.

The following season, Kennedy took a hundred wickets in a season for the first time. In 28 appearances, he took 139 wickets, averaging 17.60; he took five wickets or more in an innings on 15 occasions and ten wickets in a match on four. His best innings figures during the season of 7 for 29 came against Surrey in bowler friendly conditions at Bournemouth, whilst against the touring Australians he took 11 wickets in the match, having taken 6 for 90 in their first innings and 5 for 91 in their second. He ended the season as the third leading wicket-taker in the 1912 County Championship, behind Colin Blythe, and George Dennett. At the start of the 1913 season, Kennedy was taken ill with appendicitis, which required an operation. It was expected that this would keep out of the team until July, however, he had returned to the team by June. Despite missing the early part of the season, Kennedy still managed to take 82 wickets, averaging 23.21 from 20 appearances. He had a prolific season in 1914, which was truncated in August by the outbreak of the First World War, taking 162 wickets at an average of 20.01 from 31 appearances; he took five or more wickets in an innings ten times. He ended the season as the second leading wicket-taker in the County Championship, behind Blythe. Against Somerset, he and Arthur Jaques bowled unchanged in the match to dismiss Somerset for scores of 83 and 38. In July, he made his first appearance for the Players in the Gentlemen versus Players fixture.

=== War service and all-round success ===
With the outbreak of war, the Marylebone Cricket Club (MCC) President Francis Lacey confirmed the cessation of cricket during the war, and first-class cricket in England remained suspended until 1919. Kennedy enlisted in the war with the 5th Battalion, Hampshire Regiment, alongside peers from Hampshire. His first match following the cessation of hostilities was for L. G. Robinson's personal team against the Australian Imperial Forces in May 1919, with Kennedy subsequently making two appearances for the MCC at Lord's against Yorkshire and the Australian Imperial Forces. In the 1919 County Championship he led Hampshire's bowling aggregates with 80 wickets, averaging 25.70, single-handedly leading the Hampshire attack in the absence of Newman, who spent 1919 waiting to be demobilised from the army. Against Surrey at The Oval in June, he took 7 for 47, helping to inflict one of only three home defeats for Surrey between the end of the war and 1927. In 25 first-class matches in 1919, he scored 452 runs and made three half-centuries. In addition to his appearances for Hampshire and the MCC, he played three times for the Players in the Players versus Gentlemen fixtures of 1919, and appeared for The Rest at The Oval in the season ending Champion County fixture against Yorkshire. During the winter that followed the 1919 season, Kennedy travelled to British India, where he coached Prince Yashwant Rao Holkar at Indore.

In the 1920 season, Kennedy took 160 wickets from 29 appearances, averaging 18.30; he took five wickets or more in an innings on 16 occasions and ten or more in a match on four. For Hampshire in the 1920 County Championship, he took 164 wickets and was the Championship's joint-leading wicket-taker alongside Frank Woolley. His best innings figures that season, 9 for 33, came in the Championship against Lancashire at Liverpool, which Hampshire lost by one run. He took two hat-tricks (taking three wickets in three balls) during the season, against Gloucestershire and Somerset. He played for the MCC and the Players during 1920, in addition to appearing for Charles Thornton's personal team at the season-ending Scarborough Festival.

Kennedy emerged as a leading all-rounder in 1921, with his batting improving markedly. He completed the all-rounders double of 1,000 runs and 100 wickets for the first time. In 33 first-class appearances during the season, he took 186 wickets averaging 21.55, taking five or more wickets in an innings on 16 occasions and ten or more in a match four times. His best innings figures, 8 for 11, came against Glamorgan. Kennedy and Newman led the Hampshire attack in 1921, bowling between them 14,792 deliveries and taking 340 wickets. Against Sussex at Portsmouth, Kennedy and Newman bowled unchanged throughout the match; such was their dominance that the pair were the top two bowlers in the 1921 County Championship, with Newman taking 172 wickets and Kennedy taking 168. In 1921, he scored 1,305 runs, averaging 26.10; he scored two centuries in July, making scores of 152 not out against Nottinghamshire and 114 against Worcestershire.

Achieving consecutive doubles, the 1922 season was to be a record-breaking one for Kennedy. He took 205 wickets, averaging 16.80 from 34 matches, and taking five or more wickets in an innings on 20 occasions and ten or more in a match on seven. In the 1922 County Championship, he took 177 wickets, finishing third nationally behind Charlie Parker (195) and Tich Freeman (194); his 190 first-class wickets for Hampshire remain the most wickets taken in a season for the county. One of his most notable performances came against Somerset at Bath in the County Championship, when he took match figures of 15 wickets for 116 runs. In another notable performance, he took figures of 7 for 71 and made a half-century (70 runs) in a 10 run defeat by Sussex at Southampton. He was a member of the team that played against Warwickshire in June, where Hampshire were dismissed for 15 runs in their first innings, but subsequently went on to win the match by 155 runs, having been forced to follow-on 228 runs behind; Kennedy was one of eight batsmen to be dismissed for zero in the first innings. He combined with Newman in Warwickshire's second innings to bowl Hampshire to victory. Lamenting Hampshire's first innings collapse, Kennedy commented "Every batsman, no matter how good he is, gets a good 'un, some time or other, immediately he gets in - and out he comes. Well, this happened to all of us in one innings." His 200th wicket came at the season-ending Scarborough Festival, and in taking over 200 wickets and scoring over a thousand runs in the season, he achieved a unique double only matched by George Hirst, Maurice Tate, and Albert Trott.

=== Test selection ===
Kennedy's form in 1922 led to him being selected for the MCC's winter tour of South Africa, led by Frank Mann. He had been due to coach in Cape Town during the winter, but with his selection to the touring party his coaching engagement passed to Newman. Kennedy featured in the five first-class tour matches against South African provincial sides that preceded the Test series, before making his Test debut for England against South Africa at Johannesburg on 23 December. He played in all five Test's on the tour, ending the series as England's leading wicket-taker with 31 at an average of 19.32. He was instrumental in England's success during the 5th Test, taking figures of 5 for 76 from nearly 50 overs to help bowl England to victory by 109 runs. Earlier in the series, he had taken 5 for 88 in the 3rd Test at Durban. The cricket journalist Simon Wilde later wrote that his contributions across the series with the ball "were crucial to England's series win". Across the entirety of the tour, Kennedy took 61 wickets in the first-class matches played on the tour (inclusive of the Tests), averaging 16.78. His aggregate placed him three wickets ahead of Percy Fender.

In 1923, Kennedy achieved the double for the third consecutive season. In 33 matches, he took 184 wickets at an average of 19.55, claiming five or more wickets in an innings on 18 occasions. In the County Championship against Somerset, Newman and Kennedy bowled unchanged together for the second time. He also scored 1,327 runs, including two centuries, and averaged 25.51. He made the highest score of his first-class career in June against Warwickshire at Portsmouth, scoring an unbeaten 163 runs at the top of the order; the match was notable for Kennedy taking match figures of 9 for 77, which contributed toward Hampshire's victory by 244 runs. During the season, he made his only appearance in the North v South match, representing the South without success. In 1924, he took 135 wickets from 32 matches, averaging 20.85. Amongst the ten five wicket hauls he claimed in 1924, Kennedy took 8 for 24 against Gloucestershire at the beginning of June, taking the third hat-trick of his career in the innings. However, his batting form declined, and for the first time in three seasons he did not pass a thousand runs.

Following the conclusion of the season, Kennedy was chosen to tour South Africa with S. B. Joel's personal team during the winter. Kennedy played in fourteen first-class matches during the tour, against a mixture of provincial sides and the South African national team. He was the tourists leading wicket-taker with 65 at an average of 19.80. Returning to England, in the 1925 season, Kennedy took 142 wickets from 33 matches, averaging 18.97 and taking five wickets or more in an innings 11 times. In 1926, he failed to take a hundred wickets in a season for the first time since 1913, with 87 at an average of 31.19 from 30 matches. The Portsmouth Evening News remarked that he had endured a "lean time", which was attributed to poor health. He was afforded a benefit against Surrey in 1926, raising £1,095.

His fortunes reversed in 1927, with Kennedy taking 123 wickets at an average of 22.01 from 30 matches and claiming five wickets or more in an innings on ten occasions. He had two stand-out bowling performances during the season; the first, for Hampshire against Warwickshire in the County Championship, saw him take figures of 7 for 8, whilst the second playing for the Players in the Gentlemen versus Players match saw him take all ten wickets (10 for 37) in the Gentlemen's first innings. These figures remained the best-ever in the fixture until its discontinuation in 1962. The match was considered the highlight of the English season, with no Test matches having been played that summer. His batting also recovered in 1927, with Kennedy narrowly missing out on scoring a thousand runs in the season, with 976 at an average of 22.18. In 1928, Kennedy would complete the double for the fourth time in his career. Across 32 matches, he took 105 wickets, averaging 28.28, and scored 1,437 runs, averaging 26.61, making two centuries. The number of wickets he took in 1929 increased, with Kennedy taking 154 at an average of 18 from 29 matches; he took five wickets or more in an innings during the season on 14 occasions, including figures of 9 for 46 at Portsmouth in May to help dismiss Derbyshire for 99 runs.

=== Career twilight ===
In 1930, Kennedy would take 120 wickets from 32 matches, averaging of 25.72, and took five or more wickets in an innings on seven occasions. He would also score 1,006 runs, averaging 20.53; in taking over a hundred wickets and scoring over a thousand runs, he achieved the double for the fifth and final time of his career. His partnership with Newman, which by 1930 had spanned 20 years, came to an end when Newman retired at the end of the season. The following season, Kennedy took 131 wickets, averaging 17.31, and taking five or more wickets in an innings on 11 occasions. He took 144 wickets in 1932, averaging 18.79, and taking five or more wickets in an innings on 12 occasions; the 1932 season was the final time he would take a hundred wickets in a season. Following the season, he was chosen as one of five Wisden Cricketers of the Year for 1933. During the 1933 season, the dry English summer was not conducive to Kennedy's bowling, with him taking 88 wickets at an average of 27.10.

At the start of the 1934 season, it was announced that Kennedy would be retiring at the end of the season to take up a coaching post at Cheltenham College, having previously coached United Services in Portsmouth. During the season, he took 91 wickets, averaging 29.26 — as in 1933, the dry weather that season not being overly conducive to his bowling. He recorded his final first-class century during the season, with 130 runs against Kent in July. Following the end of the season, he was afforded a testimonial in 1935 in recognition of the services he had rendered to Hampshire cricket; this raised £397. Nevertheless, he returned to the Hampshire team in 1935, playing during the school holidays. Upon his return, he bowled effectively, taking 32 wickets from the seven County Championship matches he played in; in his first match of the season, he took 6 for 94 against Essex, and later took 7 for 46 against Northamptonshire. He again played for Hampshire during the school holidays in 1936, making five appearances in which he took 17 wickets. He retired fully from playing following the conclusion of the 1936 season.

== Playing style and statistics ==
Kennedy was a sturdily built man who possessed great stamina. A medium-pace bowler, he began with a "beautifully smooth run-up", before delivering the ball with a high arm action and with consistent accuracy. Such was his accuracy that it was reckoned that he rarely bowled a bad ball. Kennedy possessed the ability to bowl late inswingers, and was also able to impart spin on the ball, turning it from leg. He was particularly effective with the new ball, a trait that he carried throughout his career with the Huddersfield Daily Examiner remarking that even in the formative years of his career, he remained "a very good bowler when the ball is new". Hampshire came to rely upon Kennedy's bowling, and following his retirement the Hampshire Telegraph reckoned that their bowling had lost much of its effectiveness. His bowling partnership with Newman was described as "one of the most successful in county cricket". Although Kennedy was considered one of the most effective bowlers in county cricket by Wisden, he played only five Test matches. The paucity of his Test appearances was attributed by the cricket writer Simon Wilde to suspicion that lingered throughout his career surrounding the legality of his bowling action, that weighed on the minds of successive selection committees; it was opined by Wisden that this suspicion was what stood in the way of him being selected against Australia. Wilde also thought that his bowling was not of sufficient speed for Test level.

Although he began as a tail-end batsman, Kennedy developed his batting so well that by 1921 he often opened the batting, whilst at Hampshire he was known to have occupied every batting position. He was described as a "sound batsman" by Wisden, while the cricket writer Bill Frindall later described him as a "resolute batsman" who was "sound in defence". Although a cautious batter, he occasionally played innings of more aggressive intention. When he scored 101 against Kent in 1923, Wisden remarked "he was caution itself up to a point, but hit twelve fours". With the development of his batting, Kennedy became one of the most durable and consistent all-rounders in county cricket.

Kennedy made 677 appearances in first-class cricket. He took 2,874 wickets during his career, averaging 21.23, and took five or more wickets in an innings 245 times and ten wickets or more in a match 45 times. His career aggregate ranks him seventh on the all-time list of highest wicket-takers in first-class cricket. For Hampshire, Kennedy made 596 first-class appearances, second to Mead's 700. He took 2,549 wickets for Hampshire, averaging 21.16, and took five wickets or more in an innings on 205 occasions and ten wickets or more in a match on 41. He held the record for the most first-class wickets for Hampshire until 1967, when it was surpassed by Derek Shackleton. Kennedy took 100 wickets in a season on 15 occasions, a record for a Hampshire player until it was also surpassed by Shackleton. The similarity in playing styles between Kennedy and Shackleton would later draw comparisons from Arlott. He completed the double of 1,000 runs and 100 wickets in a season five times between 1921 and 1930; ten doubles have been taken for Hampshire, with Newman and Kennedy accounting for five each. He had success as a bowler with other first-class teams, beside Hampshire. Kennedy made 31 appearances for the MCC between 1919 and 1934, taking 120 wickets at 22.84. He also featured for the Players in the Gentlemen versus Players fixture 17 times between 1914 and 1934, taking 69 wickets at 19.85.

Kennedy scored 16,586 runs at an average of 18.53 during his first-class career, making ten centuries and 64 half-centuries. For Hampshire, he scored 14,925 runs, with all ten of his centuries made playing for Hampshire. He was a capable fielder, taking 531 catches in first-class cricket. For Hampshire, he took 484 catches, behind only Peter Sainsbury (601) and Mead (633).

== Personal life and death ==
Following his retirement, Kennedy continued to coach cricket at Cheltenham College, and following the Second World War, he coached in South Africa from 1947 to 1954. In later life he ran a tobacconist and stationers shop in Southampton. Kennedy was made an honorary life member at Hampshire. He had been in ill health for several months before his death on 15 November 1959 at the Hythe and Dibden War Memorial Hospital in Hythe, Hampshire. Kennedy was married with one daughter, with both surviving him. Paying tribute to Kennedy following his death, his teammate and sports journalist Harold Day expressed "There was never a greater hearted trier than Kennedy, nor was there a fairer bowler".

== See also ==
- List of Test cricketers born in non-Test playing nations

== Works cited ==
- Arlott, John (1982). John Arlott's Book of Cricketers. London: Sphere Books. ISBN 978-0-7221-1277-9 – via Internet Archive.
- Arlott, John (1985). Arlott on Cricket: His Writings on the Game. London: Fontana. ISBN 978-0-0021-8082-5 – via Internet Archive.
- Broom, John (2022). Cricket in the First World War. Barnsley: Pen and Sword History. ISBN 978-1-5267-8014-0.
- Frindall, Bill (1989). England Test Cricketers: The Complete Record from 1877. London: Willow. ISBN 978-0-0021-8339-0 – via Internet Archive.
- Johnston, Brian (2002). Johnston, Barry (ed.). Another Slice of Johnners. London: Virgin Books. ISBN 978-0-7535-0628-8 – via Internet Archive.
- Martin-Jenkins, Christopher (1980). The Complete Who's Who of Test Cricketers. London: Orbis Publishing. ISBN 978-0-7270-1262-3 – via Internet Archive.
- Overson, Chris (2017). All Ten: The Ultimate Bowling Feat. Cardiff: ACS. ISBN 978-1-9081-6589-3.
- Wilde, Simon (2013). Wisden Cricketers of the Year: A Celebration of Cricket's Greatest Players. London: John Wisden & Co. ISBN 978-1-4081-4084-0.
