= John Parker (English cricketer) =

English cricketer (1902–1984)

Personal information
- Full name: John Palmer Parker
- Born: 29 November 1902; Portsmouth, Hampshire, England
- Died: 9 August 1984 (aged 81); Warblington, Hampshire, England
- Batting: Right-handed
- Bowling: Unknown

Domestic team information
- Years: Team
- 1926–1933: Hampshire

Career statistics
Competition	First-class
Matches	47
Runs scored	1,117
Batting average	17.45
100s/50s	1/4
Top score	156
Balls bowled	354
Wickets	6
Bowling average	43.00
5 wickets in innings	–
10 wickets in match	–
Best bowling	2/14
Catches/stumpings	22/–
- Source: Cricinfo, 3 March 2010

John Palmer Parker (29 November 1902 — 9 August 1984) was an English first-class cricketer.

The son of Fred Parker, he was born at Portsmouth in November 1902. A club cricketer for Portsmouth Cricket Club, Parker was considered one of the most promising all-rounders in the Portsmouth area during the early 1920s. Having trialled for Hampshire in 1925, Parker made his debut in first-class cricket for Hampshire against Northamptonshire at Southampton in the 1926 County Championship. Two months into playing county cricket, he played for Hampshire against Kent at Canterbury. Parker was lauded for his performance during the match, with Wisden remarking that he "deserves a place in cricket history as perhaps the only inexperienced and unknown batsman to get the better of Tich Freeman at his best". Coming in with Hampshire 57 for 6, Parker proceeded to score 156 runs and shared in a partnership of 270 with Phil Mead (175) for the seventh wicket; despite their efforts, Hampshire lost the match by 9 wickets. After his debut season, in which he made fourteen appearances and scored 403 runs, Parker toured the West Indies with his Hampshire captain, Lionel Tennyson's touring team. He made two first-class appearances on the tour, playing both matches against Jamaica. He featured regularly for Hampshire in 1927, making twenty appearances and scoring exactly 500 runs and an average of exactly 20. Parker also played for the Gentlemen in the Gentlemen v Players fixture at The Oval in 1927. In the coming seasons, he featured irregularly for Hampshire, making eleven further first-class appearances to 1933; he captained Hampshire against Somerset in his final appearance. In 44 first-class matches for Hampshire, he scored 1,117 runs at an average of 17.45; he made one century and four half centuries. Despite initially starting out at club level as an all-rounder, Parker was not utilised as such by Hampshire in first-class cricket. He only occasionally bowled at county level, taking 6 wickets with best figures of 2 for 14.

Parker served in the Royal Auxiliary Air Force during the Second World War, being commissioned as a pilot officer in September 1939, with promotion to flying officer following in September 1940. He was made an acting flight lieutenant in March 1942, and was given the war substantive rank in October of the same year. Following the war, Parker was mentioned in dispatches for his service during the conflict. He later relinquished his commission in February 1954, upon which he was given the rank of squadron leader. Parker died suddenly on 9 August 1984 at Warblington, Hampshire. He was married to Nora, whom he had married at Blendworth in September 1929.
