= Alex Bowell =

English cricketer

Personal information
- Full name: Horace Alexander William Bowell
- Born: 27 April 1880; Jericho, Oxfordshire, England
- Died: 28 August 1957 (aged 77); Oxford, Oxfordshire, England
- Batting: Right-handed
- Bowling: Right-arm medium-fast
- Relatives: Norman Bowell (son)

Domestic team information
- Years: Team
- 1902–1927: Hampshire

Umpiring information
- FC umpired: 2 (1919)

Career statistics
Competition	First-class
Matches	475
Runs scored	18,509
Batting average	24.13
100s/50s	25/90
Top score	204
Balls bowled	2,973
Wickets	34
Bowling average	51.94
5 wickets in innings	–
10 wickets in match	–
Best bowling	4/20
Catches/stumpings	255/2
- Source: Cricinfo, 4 February 2010

Horace Alexander William Bowell (27 April 1880 – 28 August 1957) was an English cricketer who played first-class cricket as a batsman for Hampshire between 1902 and 1927. Bowell appeared in 473 first-class matches as a professional for Hampshire either side of the First World War, scoring over 18,000 runs and making 25 centuries. He also stood as an umpire in 1919.

== Life and cricket career ==
=== Pre-war cricket ===
Bowell was born on 27 April 1880 in Jericho, Oxford. He moved from Oxford to Hampshire in around 1899 to 1900 for employment as a carpenter with Messrs, Martin, Wells, and Co. of Aldershot. In Aldershot, he played club cricket for Aldershot Athletic Cricket Club. An opening batsman, Bowell joined the staff at Hampshire as a professional in 1902. Later in the 1902 season, he would make his debut for Hampshire in first-class cricket against Derbyshire in the County Championship. He initially batted in Hampshire's middle order in his first four County Championship matches, however in their final match of the 1902 season against Warwickshire, he was promoted to open the batting alongside Charlie Llewellyn. He established himself in the Hampshire team in 1903, making fifteen first-class appearances, and scoring 373 runs at an average of 14.92; having spent much of the season batting in the middle order, toward the end of the season he was again elevated to open the batting, and in his second match in that role he scored a maiden half century, making 61 runs against Leicestershire.

The following season, Llewellyn again returned to Hampshire's middle order, but from mid-July onward he opened the batting with Arthur Webb. He made sixteen appearances during the season, scoring 628 runs at an average of 22.42; he made scores of note against the touring South Africans (65 runs) and Somerset (95 runs). He began the 1905 season opening the batting, but returned to the middle order during the seasons middle stages, before returning to the opening position toward its conclusion. In 21 matches during the season, he scored 883 runs at an average of 22.64; he recorded his maiden century (101 runs) against Derbyshire in June. As in previous seasons, in 1906 he again spent the season fluctuating between the middle order and opening the batting, scoring 774 runs at an average of 22.11 from nineteen matches. In 1907, he would pass a thousand runs in a season for the first time, scoring 1,046 at an average of 23.24; it was during this season that he began to consistently open the batting, predominantly doing so alongside Phil Mead.

In 1908, Bowell again surpassed a thousand runs in a season, scoring 1,250 at an average of 29.76 from 25 matches; he scored three centuries during the season, notably making 160 runs against the touring Gentlemen of Philadelphia at Southampton in July. During the 1908 season, he played for the industrialist John Bamford's personal eleven in a first-class match against a Marylebone Cricket Club side at his Uttoxeter ground. Although he did not manage to reach a thousand runs for the third consecutive season in 1909, Bowell still scored 882 runs from 25 matches, averaging 24.50; his only century that season, a score of 149 runs, came against Somerset in May. He struggled for form in 1910, with his batting average dropping to 16.76 and his season aggregate of runs scored falling to 574. Bowell was selected for the East of England in 1910, playing a first-class match against the West of England at Cardiff, representing the East alongside Hampshire teammates Alec Kennedy, Mead, and Jimmy Stone. The Portsmouth Evening News observed that Bowell had suffered from "a loss of confidence" throughout the season, whilst the Bournemouth Daily Echo remarked that his season had been "disastrous".

Prior to the 1911 season, Bowell coached at the University of Oxford. He returned to form in 1911, scoring 1,418 runs at an average of 30.17 from 25 matches; he made two centuries during the season, with his highest score (146 runs) coming against Sussex in August. His form foundered again in 1912, with him scoring 683 runs at an average of 18.45 from 27 matches. He would enjoy his best season in county cricket in 1913, scoring 1,627 runs at an average of 31.28 from 28 matches. He made five centuries during the season, with his highest score that season (193 runs) coming against Oxford University, with his century coming in under an hour. His innings was said by the Hampshire Telegraph to have "blended sound defence with hard driving and clever leg hitting". During the season, he would deputise for Stone as Hampshire's wicket-keeper in their match against Kent. His good form continued into the 1914 season, with 1,267 runs at an average of 27.54 from 29 matches; he made three centuries during the season, most notably scoring a double century against Lancashire. In the match, which had been moved from Portsmouth to Bournemouth due to the outbreak of the First World War, he made 204 runs in Hampshire's first innings of 377 all out. Earlier in the season, he had been afforded a benefit match against Sussex in July, raising £425.

=== Post-war cricket ===
With the outbreak of the First World War, first-class cricket in England would not resume until 1919. Bowell resumed his first-class career with Hampshire in the 1920 season, narrowly falling short of scoring a thousand runs in the season. From 24 matches, he score 991 runs at an average of 26.78. The following season, he scored 1,111 runs at an average of 24.15 from 29 matches, recording two centuries. Against Worcestershire at Bournemouth in August, Bowell shared in a Hampshire record partnership for the tenth wicket of 192 runs with Walter Livsey, a record which as of 2026 still stands; Hampshire had recovered from 118 for 9, with Bowell making 133 runs from the middle order. He again passed a thousand runs for the season in 1922, scoring 1,227 runs at an average of 24.54 from 29 matches, whilst recording two centuries. He was a member of the Hampshire team that played in the County Championship match against Warwickshire, where Hampshire were dismissed for 15 runs in their first innings, but subsequently went onto win the match by 155 runs, having been forced to follow-on 228 runs behind; Bowell was one of eight batsmen to make ducks in Hampshire's first innings.

In 1923, Bowell scored 786 runs at an average of 21.83 from 22 matches, with one century, while the following season he scored 571 runs at an average of 21.97 from 19 matches. His modest form continued into 1925, when he scored 769 runs at an average of 21.97. Bowell passed a thousand runs in a season for the final time in 1926, scoring 1,090 runs at an average of 26.95, making three centuries. He struggled for form in 1927, playing in 19 matches and scoring 406 runs at an average of 16.24. Bowell played his final first-class match in July.

=== Statistics and playing style ===
It was opined by The Cricketer Annual that Bowell was "particularly good at cutting" the ball, with Wisden commenting that he was also "sound in defence". In 473 first-class matches for Hampshire, he scored 18,466 runs at an average of 24.20, making 25 centuries and 90 half centuries. In terms of total runs scored for Hampshire, Bowell ranks eleventh. A part-time right-arm fast-medium bowler, he took 34 wickets during his career, with best figures of 4 for 20 against Warwickshire in 1913, in a match in which he also made a half century (53 runs). Bowell was considered to be a good fielder, excelling at cover-point. In his first-class career, he took 260 catches.

== Umpiring ==
Bowell stood as an umpire in two first-class matches in 1919. He stood firstly in the match between Oxford University and the Gentlemen of England, and secondly in the match between Oxford University and the Australian Imperial Force Touring XI, with both matches played at Oxford.

== Personal life and death ==
Bowell divorced his wife in July 1922, on the grounds of her infidelity. During the latter part of his cricket career, he supplemented his income from cricket by becoming a publican. After retiring from playing, he had settled in Oxford by 1930. Bowell died in hospital in Oxford on 28 August 1957, aged 76. His son, Norman, would also play first-class cricket for Hampshire. He would be killed during the Second World War while a prisoner of war of the Japanese.
