= Arthur Jaques =

English cricketer

Personal information
- Full name: Arthur Jaques
- Born: 7 March 1888; Shanghai, China
- Died: 27 September 1915 (aged 27); Loos, Nord-Pas-de-Calais, France
- Height: 6 ft 3 in (1.91 m)
- Batting: Right-handed
- Bowling: Leg break Right-arm medium

Domestic team information
- Years: Team
- 1912/13: Marylebone Cricket Club
- 1913–1914: Hampshire

Career statistics
Competition	First-class
Matches	60
Runs scored	982
Batting average	12.75
100s/50s	–/1
Top score	68
Balls bowled	9,175
Wickets	175
Bowling average	21.91
5 wickets in innings	10
10 wickets in match	3
Best bowling	8/21
Catches/stumpings	39/–
- Source: Cricinfo, 22 February 2010

Arthur Jaques (7 March 1888 — 27 September 1915) was an English first-class cricketer and British Army officer. Having initially played first-class cricket for the Marylebone Cricket Club on a tour of the West Indies in early 1913, Jaques played first-class cricket in the County Championship for Hampshire County Cricket Club in 1913 and 1914, forming a successful bowling partnership with Alec Kennedy. In his two seasons playing for Hampshire, he took 168 wickets and was due to inherit the captaincy for the 1915 season, however the outbreak of the First World War meant he would never get the opportunity to captain Hampshire. Jaques would serve in the war with the West Yorkshire Regiment and was subsequently killed in action in September 1915 at the Battle of Loos.

== Early life and cricket career ==
The son of Joseph Jaques, he was born in Shanghai in March 1888. He was educated in England at Aldenham School in Hertfordshire, where he played for the school cricket team as a bowler. From there, he matriculated to Trinity College, Cambridge; while studying at Cambridge, he did not play for the Cambridge University Cricket Club eleven, but did play in the freshman match of 1908. Jaques toured the West Indies with the Marylebone Cricket Club (MCC) in early 1913, making his debut in first-class cricket on the tour against Barbados at Bridgetown. He made a further seven first-class appearances on the tour, scoring 106 runs and taking 5 wickets. A member of Hampshire Hogs Cricket Club, he subsequently made his debut for Hampshire in the 1913 County Championship against Derbyshire at Southampton. He appeared regularly for Hampshire during the 1913 season, a season in which Wisden claimed "he did nothing remarkable" in. His debut season yielded him 53 wickets at an average of 28.35, with also him taking his maiden five wicket haul. Jaques also made a first-class appearance in 1913 for L. G. Robinson's XI against J. R. Mason's XI at Old Buckenham.

Jaques had a prolific season the following year, making a further 28 first-class appearances, 26 of which came for Hampshire, as well as appearing twice for the Gentlemen in the Gentlemen v Players fixtures at The Oval and Lord's. In these, he took 117 wickets at an average of 18.69, taking a five wicket haul on eight occasions and ten wickets in a match on three. His best career figures of 8 for 21 came in 1914, against Somerset. He formed a potent bowling partnership with Alec Kennedy, with the pair often bowling unchanged and helping take Hampshire to fifth place in the County Championship, their highest-ever finish. Wisden attributed his success as a bowler to his unusual methods, which involved placing his field mostly on the on-side, pitching on the wicket or just outside the leg-stump, and swinging the ball into the batsman to cramp them for room and force them into losing patience and making an error. Jaques was a useful lower order batsman, scoring 982 across his first-class career at a batting average of 12.75; he made one half century, a score of 68 against Worcestershire in 1914, in which he put on a partnership of 107 for the tenth wicket with Walter Livsey. Following the 1914 season, Jacques was due to inherit the Hampshire captaincy from Edward Sprot for the 1915 season, however he would never have the chance to take up the captaincy.

== World War I service and death ==
With the beginning of the First World War in July 1914, first-class cricket in England was suspended the following month, following a statement from MCC secretary Francis Lacey. Jaques volunteered to serve in the war, receiving a commission into the West Yorkshire Regiment as a temporary second lieutenant in October 1914, before being made a temporary lieutenant in the following month. In February 1915, he was made a temporary captain. Jaques fought in the Battle of Loos in September 1915, during the course of which he was killed in action on the 27th; he was killed on the same day as his brother, Joseph Hodgson Jaques. Jaques was initially listed as missing, but was declared as killed in action in December. His body was never recovered, with him being commemorated on the Loos Memorial. In England, he was commemorated at the Stoneham War Shrine in Hampshire and on a fumed oak panel commemorating the Hampshire cricketers who fell during the war, which was unveiled by his mother in June 1922. In his will, Jaques bequeathed £500 to Hampshire County Cricket Club. He was survived by his widow, Edith Glenny Vale, whom he had married at South Stoneham a little over a month prior to his death.

== Works cited ==
- Broom, John (2022). Cricket in the First World War. Pen and Sword History. p. 26. ISBN 9781526780140.
