= Sydney Maartensz =

English cricketer

Personal information
- Full name: Sydney Gratien Adair Maartensz
- Born: 14 April 1882; Colombo, British Ceylon
- Died: 10 September 1967 (aged 85); Pyrford, Surrey, England
- Batting: Right-handed
- Role: Wicket-keeper

Domestic team information
- Years: Team
- 1919: Hampshire

Career statistics
Competition	First-class
Matches	12
Runs scored	283
Batting average	18.86
100s/50s	–/1
Top score	60
Catches/stumpings	21/4
- Source: Cricinfo, 9 December 2007

Sydney Gratien Adair Maartensz (14 April 1882 — 10 September 1967) was a Ceylonese-born English first-class cricketer.

Maartensz was born into a Burgher family at Colombo in April 1882. He spent his youth in British Malaya, where he was educated at the Victoria Institution. Prior to the First World War, he played in Malaya for the Straits Settlements cricket team in interport matches against Hong Kong and Shanghai. During the war, he served in the British Army as a trooper with the Honourable Artillery Company. Following the war, he played first-class cricket for Hampshire as a wicket-keeper, deputising for Walter Livsey while he was still on active service in India, and favoured over George Brown, who was utilised more was a bowler. Making his first-class debut against Middlesex at Lord's in the County Championship, Maartensz made a further eleven first-class appearances in 1919. In these, he scored 283 runs at an average of 18.86, with one half century score of 60. As wicket-keeper, he took 21 catches and made four stumpings. John Arlott described his wicket-keeping abilities as "far above the usual standard of amateur wicket-keepers". Maartensz died in September 1967 at Pyrford, Surrey.
