= Oldfields Ground =

Cricket ground in Uttoxeter, Staffordshire, England

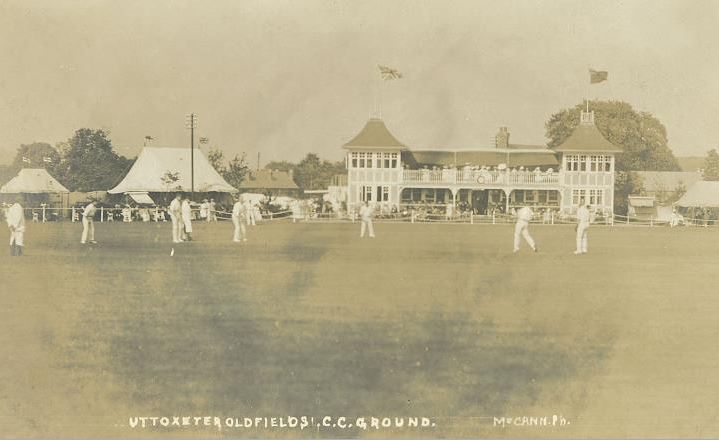
- Interactive map of Oldfields Ground

Ground information
- Location: Uttoxeter, Staffordshire
- Country: England
- Coordinates: 52.9000°N 1.8738°W
- Establishment: 1905 (first recorded match)

Team information
| Staffordshire | (1905–1906 & 1950–1970) |
| J. Bamford's XI | (1907–1909) |
- As of 14 August 2010; Source: Ground profile

Oldfields Ground is a cricket ground in Uttoxeter, Staffordshire. The first recorded match on the ground was in 1905, when Staffordshire played Bedfordshire in the grounds first Minor Counties Championship match. The county played a further Minor Counties match on the ground in 1906, but after that it would not be until 1950 that Staffordshire used the ground again, using it as a home venue from 1950 to 1970. In total, the ground hosted 21 Minor Counties Championship matches, with the final Minor Counties match seeing Staffordshire play Durham.

Formed by John Bamford, who was a North of England industrialist, J. Bamford's XI used the ground for first-class matches, the first of which was against the touring South Africans in 1907, the second was against the Marylebone Cricket Club Australian Touring Team in 1908 and the touring Australians in 1909.

The last county match on the ground was the 1970 Minor Counties Championship fixture between Staffordshire and Durham. The ground is still in use and the pavilion is a listed building.
