= Peter Wynne-Thomas =

English cricket historian (1934–2021)

Peter Wynne-Thomas BEM
- Born: 30 July 1934; Manchester, England
- Died: 15 July 2021 (aged 86)
- Education: University of London
- Occupations: Cricket archivist and statistician

Peter Wynne-Thomas BEM (30 July 1934 – 15 July 2021) was an English cricket writer, historian and statistician who was for many years the archivist and librarian of Nottinghamshire CCC. The library at Nottinghamshire's Trent Bridge cricket ground is named The Wynne-Thomas Library in his honour. He was one of the Nottinghamshire general committee members, and in 2016 he was elected President of Nottinghamshire County Cricket Club.

== Life ==
Peter Wynne-Thomas was born on 30 July 1934 in Manchester to Daniel Wynne-Thomas, an architect, and Melrose (née Booth), a solicitor, and was educated at Belmont School and Lancing College in West Sussex.

He was trained as an architectural consultant at the University of London but, from what began as a hobby, he specialised in cricket statistics and research. He wrote cricket books, some intended for those with a beginner's or casual interest in the sport. Examples are the Hamlyn A-Z of Cricket Records, which is a selection of statistical information; and A History of Cricket: From the Weald to the World which presents an account of cricket's history. His Nottinghamshire Cricketers 1821–1914 won The Cricket Society Book of the Year Award in 1971.

During the 1960s, Wynne-Thomas worked with Rowland Bowen on The Cricket Quarterly. In 1973, he was involved in the foundation of the Association of Cricket Statisticians and Historians (ACS). He was the original treasurer until 1974 and then secretary until he retired in 2006.

Wynne-Thomas managed the Sport-in-Print bookshop (opposite the Trent Bridge Inn by Trent Bridge Cricket Ground in Nottingham) from December 1987. The ACS purchased the premises in 1993 as its headquarters. Wynne-Thomas combined his shop and ACS roles until March 2006, when he retired and the shop was sold, the ACS relocating to Cardiff.

He was awarded the British Empire Medal in the 2019 New Year's Honours List for his services to cricket. He married twice: in 1975 to Margaret Barnett with whom he had a daughter, and in 2000 to Edith North. He died on 15 July 2021, aged 86, of bowel cancer.

== Works ==
Publications by Wynne-Thomas include the following :

- Nottinghamshire Cricketers 1821-1914 (1971)
- Nottinghamshire Cricketers 1919-1939 (1980)
- England on Tour (1983)
- Who's Who of Cricketers (with Philip Bailey and Philip Thorn) (1984)
- Cricket in Conflict (with Peter Arnold) (1984)
- A-Z of Cricket Records (1985)
- Give Me Arthur: A Biography of Arthur Shrewsbury (1985)
- Nottinghamshire: Cricket's Double Champions 1987 (1988)
- The History of Hampshire County Cricket Club (1988)
- The Complete History of Cricket Tours at Home and Abroad (1989)
- The History of Lancashire County Cricket Club (1989)
- The Australian Tour to England 1948 (with Peter Griffiths) (1990)
- The History of Nottinghamshire County Cricket Club (1992)
- Sir Julien Cahn's Team 1923-1941 (1994)
- Nottinghamshire County Cricket Club First-Class Records 1826–1995 (1996)
- The History of Cricket: From the Weald to the World (1997)
- Ivo Bligh (2002)
- Nottinghamshire County Cricket Grounds (2002)
- FS Ashley-Cooper: A Biographical Sketch And Bibliography (2003)
- Cricket's Historians (2011)
- William Clarke: The Old General (2014)
- Arthur Carr: The Rise and Fall of Nottinghamshire's Bodyline Captain (2017)

=== Co-authored with Peter Arnold ===
- The Illustrated History of the Test Match (1988)
- An Ashes Anthology (1989)
- The Ashes: A Complete Illustrated History (1990)
- The Complete Book of Cricket (1997)
- The Ultimate Encyclopedia of Cricket (1997)
- The Best Book of Cricket Stats and Facts Ever! (1999)
- The Complete Encyclopedia of Cricket (2007)
