= Peter Sunnucks =

English cricketer

Peter Regan Sunnucks (22 June 1916 – 3 February 1997) was an English cricketer who played first-class cricket for Kent between 1934 and 1946. He was born at Boughton Monchelsea in Kent and died at Marden, also in Kent.

Sunnucks was a professional right-handed batsman, often used as an opener. He played fairly regularly for Kent's first team in the period from 1936 to 1938, playing in 20 matches in 1937 when the regular Kent opening batsman, Arthur Fagg, was ill. It was in the 1937 season that he made his only first-class century, an innings of 162 against Nottinghamshire spread across six-and-a-half hours and containing 21 fours. In 1938, Fagg returned to health and to the regular opening position in the Kent team. Sunnucks, with fewer opportunities, was, however, Fagg's opening partner when he set a so-far-unequalled record of two double-centuries in a match: in the game against Essex, Sunnucks contributed 82 to a second-innings opening partnership of 283 which was the Kent record for the first wicket until 1991.

Sunnucks played in only a few matches in the 1939 season and though he returned for two games after the Second World War, he was not successful and did not appear again.

== Bibliography ==
- Carlaw, Derek (2020). Kent County Cricketers, A to Z: Part Two (1919–1939) (PDF). Cardiff: ACS.
