= Jimmy Stone =

English cricketer and umpire (1876–1942)

Personal information
- Full name: James Stone
- Born: 29 November 1876; Southampton, Hampshire, England
- Died: 15 November 1942 (aged 65); Maidenhead, Berkshire, England
- Batting: Right-handed
- Role: Wicketkeeper-batsman

Domestic team information
- Years: Team
- 1900–1914: Hampshire
- 1920: Berkshire
- 1922–1923: Glamorgan

Umpiring information
- FC umpired: 239 (1912–1934)

Career statistics
Competition	First-class
Matches	306
Runs scored	10,341
Batting average	22.43
100s/50s	6/48
Top score	174
Balls bowled	72
Wickets	1
Bowling average	104.00
5 wickets in innings	0
10 wickets in match	0
Best bowling	1/77
Catches/stumpings	392/132
- Source: Cricinfo, 27 April 2017

James Stone (29 November 1876 – 15 November 1942) was an English first-class cricketer and umpire. A batsman and wicket-keeper, he played for Hampshire and Glamorgan between 1900 and 1923, making over 300 first-class appearances, in which he scored over 10,000 runs and claimed over 400 dismissals as a wicket-keeper. He later stood as an umpire in nearly 240 matches between 1912 and 1934.

== Playing career ==
=== Career with Hampshire ===
Stone was born at Southampton in November 1876. He was given a trial by Hampshire in 1900, making his debut in first-class cricket against Surrey at Bournemouth in the County Championship. He made three further first-class appearances in the 1901 County Championship, before replacing Charles Robson as Hampshire's regular wicket-keeper in 1902; by establishing himself in the Hampshire side, he became the first local-born professional to do so. He made twelve appearances in 1902, followed by fourteen in 1903. During the 1903 Bournemouth Cricket Week, he played for the Players of the South against the Gentlemen of the South. After playing eighteen matches in 1904 and recording his first half century, Stone featured in 21 matches for Hampshire in 1905, scoring his maiden century with 174 against Sussex at Portsmouth. During the 1905 season, he played two first-class matches during the Bournemouth Cricket Week, appearing once more for the Players of the South against the Gentlemen of the South, in addition to playing for an England XI against the touring Australians.

Stone featured in sixteen matches for Hampshire in 1906, and 25 in 1907. He enjoyed his best season with the bat in 1907, scoring 941 runs at an average of 24.12. In 1908, he made 23 appearances for Hampshire and appeared in the end-of-season commemorative first-class match between Hambledon and an England XI at Broadhalfpenny Down, with Stone playing for Hambledon. The following season he recorded his second century, making 109 runs against Worcestershire, having made 78 earlier in the match. His 23 matches that season saw him compliment his century with five half centuries, In 1910, he again scored a century, making 105 against Lancashire, having made 80 earlier in the match. He also played for the East against the West during the 1910 season, complimenting the 23 matches he played for Hampshire that season.

For the next three seasons (1911, 1912 and 1913), he passed 1,000 runs each season. He was awarded a benefit match against Yorkshire in 1912, which was the most successful benefit for any Hampshire professional up to that point: Opening the batting, he helped put on 109 runs with C. B. Fry for the third wicket, though Hampshire lost the match by 9 wickets due to a batting collapse in their second innings facilitated by George Hirst and Schofield Haigh. Stone's final season with Hampshire was in 1914, when the First World War led to the cancellation of first-class cricket in August 1914. Prior to that, Stone made fifteen first-class appearances and made an unbeaten century against Worcestershire. With wicket-keeper Walter Livsey coming into the Hampshire side in 1914, Stone seemingly retired during the five years in which no first-class cricket was played.

Stone was largely utilised as Hampshire's first-choice wicket-keeper from 1902 to 1904, and as an opening or top-order batsman who Wisden described as a "steady batsman" who was "strongly built". In 274 first-class matches for Hampshire, he scored 9,167 runs at an average of 22.30, making five centuries and 43 half centuries. As Hampshire's wicket-keeper, he took 355 catches and made 114 stumpings. Stumpings accounted for nearly 25% of his dismissals, a high percentage when compared with modern wicket-keepers.

=== Career with Glamorgan ===
Following the war, Stone had a brief spell playing minor counties cricket for Berkshire in the 1919 Minor Counties Championship, making two appearances against Hertfordshire and Buckinghamshire. He then moved to South Wales to play club cricket for Briton Ferry.

Glamorgan gained first-class status in 1921, but were without the services of a regular wicket-keeper during their inaugural season and had to make-do with amateur or occasional wicket-keepers, such as George Cording. Having qualified through residency, Stone made his debut for Glamorgan against Northamptonshire at Swansea in the 1922 County Championship. He made five first-class appearances for Glamorgan in 1922, and 22 in the 1923 season. This season would be Stone's last before his retirement, but he notably scored a century (108) against the touring West Indians at Cardiff, aged 46, and shared in a partnership of 136 with Frank Pinch; in doing so he became the first Glamorgan batsman to score a first-class century against a touring team. In his final season he scored 959 runs at an average of 25.23; this was the highest number of runs scored by a Glamorgan wicket-keeper in a season until 2011, when it was surpassed by Mark Wallace.

== Umpiring and later life ==
After retiring as a player, Stone became a first-class cricket umpire. He first stood as a first-class umpire in 1912, when Hampshire played Oxford University. The remainder of his umpiring career occurred after his retirement from playing. He stood in 238 first-class matches between 1925 and 1934. Stone died in November 1942 in Maidenhead, aged 65.
