= 1922 English cricket season =

1922 was the 29th season of County Championship cricket in England. Yorkshire recovered the title and went on to win it four times in succession.

== Honours ==
- County Championship – Yorkshire
- Minor Counties Championship – Buckinghamshire
- Wisden – Arthur Carr, Tich Freeman, Charlie Parker, C. A. G. Russell, Andy Sandham

== Leading batsmen ==
Patsy Hendren topped the averages with 2072 runs @ 66.83

== Leading bowlers ==
Wilfred Rhodes topped the averages with 119 wickets @ 12.19

== Notable matches ==
Warwickshire and Hampshire took part in one of the most remarkable of all County Championship matches, at Edgbaston on 14–16 June. Warwickshire made 223 and then dismissed Hampshire for only 15, Calthorpe taking 4/4 and Howell 6/7. Eight batsmen made ducks. Following on, Hampshire did much better, but still seemed certain to lose at 274 for 8. George Brown with 172, and the captain's valet and wicket-keeper Walter Livsey with 110 not out, took the total to 521. Warwickshire needed 314 to win. Jack Newman and Alec Kennedy then bowled Hampshire to a remarkable victory.

== Annual reviews ==
- Wisden Cricketers' Almanack 1923
