= Hampshire Advertiser =

Local newspaper for Hampshire, England

The Hampshire Advertiser was a British local, broadsheet newspaper, based in Southampton, Hampshire. It ran from 1823 until 1940.

Edward Langdon Oke (1775–1840), a corn merchant in the older part of the city (High Street), was credited with establishing the Hampshire Advertiser (previously the "Herald"). Oke, originally from Sherborne, was elected to the Town Council of Southampton and appointed Consul at Southampton for the Kingdom of Hanover by Prince Regent George IV in 1818.
