= 1914 English cricket season =

1914 was the twenty-fifth season of County Championship cricket in England. It was terminated at the end of August following the outbreak of the First World War. The last four matches to be played all finished on 2 September and the remaining five scheduled fixtures were cancelled.

== Honours ==
- County Championship – Surrey
- Minor Counties Championship – Staffordshire
- Wisden – Johnny Douglas, Percy Fender, Wally Hardinge, Donald Knight, Sydney Smith

== County Championship ==
	County	Played	Won	Lost	First Innings			Points		%
	County	Played	Won	Lost	Won	Lost	No result	Poss	Obtd	%
1	Surrey	26 (Note: Owing to the war, the matches Somerset v. Northamptonshire at Taunton on 10, 11 and 12 August, Sussex v. Surrey at Brighton on 3, 4, and 5 September for the benefit of George Cox, and Surrey v Leicestershire at the Oval on 7, 8 and 9 September were not played and are not included in the count of "matches played".)	15	2	5	3	1	125	93	74.40
2	Middlesex	20	11	2	4	3	0	100	70	70.00
3	Kent	28	16	7	1	4	0	140	87	62.14
4	Yorkshire	28	14	4	3	7	0	140	86	61.42
5	Hampshire	28	13	4	3	8	0	140	82	58.57
6	Sussex	27	10	6	4	6	1	130	68	52.30
7	Warwickshire	24	9	7	4	4	0	120	61	50.83
8	Essex	24	9	9	4	2	0	120	59	49.16
9	Northamptonshire	21	7	6	4	4	0	105	51	48.57
10	Nottinghamshire	20	5	5	6	3	1	95	46	48.42
11	Lancashire	26	6	9	5	6	0	130	51	39.23
12	Derbyshire	20	5	12	3	0	0	100	34	34.00
13	Leicestershire	23	4	11	5	3	0	115	38	33.04
14	Worcestershire	22	2	13	3	3	1	105	22	20.95
15	Somerset	19	3	16	0	0	0	95	15	15.78
15	Gloucestershire	22	1	17	3	1	0	110	15	13.63
Details as recorded in John Wisden’s Cricketers’ Almanack

== Minor Counties Championship ==
Essex Second Eleven entered the competition for the first time. The county had, however, had a highly successful second eleven so early as 1902.

The Minor Counties Championship was, much more than the first-class competition, ruined by the outbreak of war in August when most of the matches were scheduled to be played. Some teams played as few as two games.

Staffordshire – who were leading the table when the last games were played – were declared as champions.

1914 Minor Counties Championship table (Note: Twenty-five matches were abandoned on account of the war and are not included in "matches played".)
	County	Played	Won	First innings			Points		%
	County	Played	Won	Won	Lost	No result	Poss	Obtd	%
1	Staffordshire	10	8	1	0	0	50	43	86.00
2	Hertfordshire	8	4	2	1	1	35	27	77.14
3	Devon	4	3	0	0	0	20	15	75.00
4	Wiltshire	4	2	1	0	0	20	13	65.00
5	Kent Second Eleven	10	4	2	1	1	45	27	60.00
6	Glamorgan	8	2	2	2	1	35	18	51.42
6	Norfolk	7	2	2	2	0	35	18	51.42
8	Buckinghamshire	2	1	0	0	0	10	5	50.00
8	Lincolnshire	6	3	0	0	0	30	15	50.00
8	Surrey Second Eleven	8	3	1	2	0	40	20	50.00
11	Cornwall	7	2	2	0	0	35	16	45.71
12	Cheshire	7	3	0	0	0	35	15	42.85
13	Durham	9	3	1	1	0	45	19	42.22
14	Monmouthshire	7	1	1	1	2	25	9	36.00
15	Northumberland	6	2	0	0	0	30	10	33.33
16	Cambridgeshire	7	2	0	1	0	35	11	31.42
17	Berkshire	4	1	0	1	0	20	6	30.00
17	Bedfordshire	5	1	0	1	1	20	6	30.00
19	Essex Second Eleven	7	1	0	2	0	35	7	20.00
20	Suffolk	6	1	0	0	0	30	5	16.66
21	Dorset	2	0	0	0	0	10	0	0.00

- Five points were awarded for a win.
- Three points were awarded for "winning" the first innings of a drawn match.
- One point was awarded for "losing" the first innings of a drawn match.
- Matches in which no result was achieved on the first innings were not included in calculating maximum possible points.
- Final placings were decided by calculating the percentage of possible points.

== Leading batsmen (qualification 20 innings) ==
1914 English season leading batsmen
Name	Team	Matches	Innings	Not outs	Runs	Highest score	Average	100s
J. W. Hearne	Middlesex	26	43	8	2116	204	60.45	8
Jack Hobbs	Surrey	29	48	2	2697	226	58.63	11
Phil Mead	Hampshire	31	53	5	2476	213	51.58	7
John Gunn	Nottinghamshire	20	34	5	1358	154 not out	46.82	3
Frank Tarrant	Middlesex MCC	26	44	4	1879	250 not out	45.82	3
Frank Woolley	Kent	31	52	2	2272	160 not out	45.44	6
Robert Relf	Sussex	15	24	1	989	130	43.00	3
Sidney Smith	Northamptonshire	21	34	2	1373	177	42.90	1
Andy Ducat	Surrey	25	38	6	1370	118	42.81	4
Johnny Tyldesley	Lancashire	26	47	5	1754	253	41.76	4

== Leading bowlers (qualification 1,000 balls) ==
1914 English season leading bowlers
Name	Team	Matches	Balls bowled	Runs conceded	Wickets taken	Average	Best bowling	5 wickets in innings	10 wickets in match
Colin Blythe	Kent	29	6052	2583	170	15.19	9/97	13	5
Alonzo Drake	Yorkshire	31	6104	2418	158	15.30	10/35	11	1
Cec Parkin	Lancashire	6	1216	535	34	15.73	7/34	3	1
Sidney Smith	Northamptonshire	21	4123	1707	105	16.25	6/52	8	1
James Horsley	Derbyshire	13	1921	915	56	16.33	6/77	5	1
Jack White	Somerset	13	3692	1409	85	16.57	9/46	10	4
Harold McDonnell	Hampshire	8	1003	609	35	17.40	7/47	2	1
Major Booth	Yorkshire	31	5903	2803	157	17.85	8/64	13	3
Wilfred Rhodes	Yorkshire	31	5044	2157	118	18.27	7/19	4	1
Archibald Slater	Derbyshire	20	2864	1264	69	18.31	6/19	5	1

== Notable events ==
- To celebrate the centenary of the Marylebone Cricket Club, a match was played at Lord's on 22, 23 and 24 June between the previous winter's MCC South African team and a representative team from the Rest of England. The game was not a success: champion bowler Barnes did not play for the MCC team, who also had the worst of the pitch and lost by an innings.
- On 31 July against Warwickshire at Edgbaston, Northamptonshire's George Thompson becomes the first fielder to hold three catches off successive balls. (Note: This feat was not to be emulated by any other out-fielder until Marcus Trescothick in 2018. Four wicket-keepers have also achieved a hat-trick of catches, but none predated Thompson's achievement.) – the first three of four wickets in four balls by Sidney Smith.
- In August at Weston-super-Mare in the first cricket week at the ground, Yorkshire's Alonzo Drake – in what would become his second-last first-class game – takes all ten Somerset wickets while bowling just 53 balls. This remains the fewest balls bowled to take all ten wickets, and Drake actually took the ten in just 42 consecutive deliveries – also a record.

== Annual reviews ==
- John Wisden's Cricketer's Almanack, 1915

== See also ==
- Cricket in the Great War
