= 1934 English cricket season =

1934 was the 41st season of County Championship cricket in England. England lost the Ashes with Don Bradman again the crucial difference between two very strong teams, Australia winning 2–1. Lancashire won the championship.

== Honours ==
- County Championship – Lancashire
- Minor Counties Championship – Lancashire II
- Wisden – Stan McCabe, Bill O'Reilly, George Paine, Bill Ponsford, Jim Smith

== Test series ==
England lost the Ashes to Australia who won the first and final Tests. England won the second by an innings, Hedley Verity taking 15 wickets, with the other two matches drawn.

Cumulative record – Test wins	1876–1934
England	52
Australia	53
Drawn	29

== Leading batsmen ==
Don Bradman topped the averages with 2020 runs @ 84.16

== Leading bowlers ==
Bill O'Reilly topped the averages with 109 wickets @ 17.04

== Annual reviews ==
- Wisden Cricketers' Almanack 1935
