= 1923 English cricket season =

1923 was the 30th season of County Championship cricket in England. Yorkshire won the title for the 12th time.

== Honours ==
- County Championship - Yorkshire
- Minor Counties Championship - Buckinghamshire
- Wisden - Arthur Gilligan, Roy Kilner, George Macaulay, Cecil Parkin, Maurice Tate

== Leading batsmen ==
Patsy Hendren topped the averages with 3010 runs @ 77.17

== Leading bowlers ==
Wilfred Rhodes topped the averages with 134 wickets @ 11.54

== Annual reviews ==
- Wisden Cricketers' Almanack 1924
