= 1929 English cricket season =

1929 was the 36th season of County Championship cricket in England. South Africa were on tour and England won the Test series 2–0. In domestic cricket, Nottinghamshire overcame their two northern rivals, Lancashire and Yorkshire, to win the County Championship.

== Honours ==
- County Championship - Nottinghamshire
- Minor Counties Championship - Oxfordshire
- Wisden - Ted Bowley, K S Duleepsinhji, Tuppy Owen-Smith, Walter Robins, Bob Wyatt

== Test series ==
England defeated South Africa 2–0 with three matches drawn.

== Leading batsmen ==
Jack Hobbs topped the averages with 2263 runs @ 66.55

== Leading bowlers ==
Dick Tyldesley topped the averages with 154 wickets @ 15.57

== Annual reviews ==
- Wisden Cricketers' Almanack 1930
