= 1926 English cricket season =

1926 was the 33rd season of County Championship cricket in England. England regained the Ashes and Lancashire won the championship.

== Honours ==
- County Championship - Lancashire
- Minor Counties Championship - Durham
- Wisden - George Geary, Harold Larwood, Jack Mercer, Bert Oldfield, Bill Woodfull

== Test series ==
England regained the Ashes by winning the final Test at The Oval after the first four matches against Australia were all drawn. Because the series was at stake, the match was to be "timeless", i.e. played to a finish. Australia had a narrow first innings lead of 22. Jack Hobbs and Herbert Sutcliffe took the score to 49–0 at the end of the second day, a lead of 27. Heavy rain fell overnight, and next day the pitch soon developed into a traditional sticky wicket. England seemed doomed to be bowled out cheaply and to lose the match. In spite of the very difficult batting conditions, however, Hobbs and Sutcliffe took their partnership to 172 before Hobbs was out for exactly 100. Sutcliffe went on to make 161 and in the end England won the game comfortably

Cumulative record - Test wins	1876–1926
England	42
Australia	47
Drawn	25

== Leading batsmen ==
Jack Hobbs topped the averages, at the age of 43, with 2949 runs @ 77.60

== Leading bowlers ==
Wilfred Rhodes topped the averages with 115 wickets @ 14.86, outdoing Hobbs since he was aged 48.

== Annual reviews ==
- Wisden Cricketers' Almanack 1927
