= 1926 County Championship =

English cricket tournament

- Cricket format: First-class cricket
- Tournament format: League system
- Champions: Lancashire (3rd title)
- Participants: 17

The 1926 County Championship was the 33rd officially organised running of the County Championship. Lancashire County Cricket Club won the championship title for the third time.

Final placings were still decided by calculating the percentage of points gained against possible points available. The matches Yorks vs Notts, Derbys vs Leics, Northants vs Sussex were abandoned without a ball being bowled.

== Table ==
- Five points were awarded for a win.
- Three points were awarded for "winning" the first innings of a drawn match.
- Two points were awarded for "tying" the first innings of a drawn match.
- One point was awarded for "losing" the first innings of a drawn match.
- Final placings were decided by calculating the percentage of possible points.

County Championship table
Team	Pld	W	L	DWF	DLF	T	NR	Pts	%PC
Lancashire	32	17	2	6	3	0	4	106	75.71
Yorkshire	31	14	0	10	4	0	3	104	74.28
Kent	28	15	2	3	8	0	0	92	65.71
Nottinghamshire	29	13	7	4	5	0	0	82	56.55
Surrey	26	7	4	8	3	0	4	62	56.36
Middlesex	24	9	4	0	6	0	5	51	53.68
Hampshire	28	10	5	4	8	0	1	70	51.85
Glamorgan	24	9	9	1	0	0	5	48	50.52
Essex	30	6	9	9	3	1	2	62.5	44.64
Sussex	27	6	10	6	5	0	0	53	39.25
Derbyshire	23	5	7	4	6	0	1	43	39.09
Warwickshire	28	2	9	8	5	0	4	39	32.50
Leicestershire	27	5	12	3	4	0	3	38	31.66
Somerset	26	3	9	3	6	1	4	32.5	29.54
Gloucestershire	30	5	17	3	4	0	1	38	26.20
Northamptonshire	25	3	13	4	5	0	0	32	25.60
Worcestershire	28	3	13	3	4	0	5	28	24.34

- Essex and Somerset were awarded 2.5 points each for a tie after the match ended with scores tied and with Essex having one wicket remaining.
