= 1922 County Championship =

English cricket tournament

- Cricket format: First-class cricket
- Tournament format: League system
- Champions: Yorkshire (11th title)
- Participants: 17

The 1922 County Championship was the 29th officially organised running of the County Championship. Yorkshire County Cricket Club won the championship title.

The minimum number of matches required to qualify for the championship was increased to eleven home and away.

== Table ==
- Five points were awarded for a win.
- Two points were awarded for "winning" the first innings of a drawn match.
- Final placings were decided by calculating the percentage of possible points.

County Championship table
Team	Pld	W	L	DWF	DLF	NR	Pts	%PC
Yorkshire	30	19	2	6	2	1	107	73.79
Nottinghamshire	28	17	5	4	0	2	93	71.53
Surrey	24	13	1	6	3	1	77	66.95
Kent	28	16	3	3	5	1	86	63.70
Lancashire	30	15	7	2	4	2	79	56.42
Hampshire	28	13	6	3	4	2	71	54.61
Middlesex	22	10	6	3	3	0	56	50.90
Essex	26	7	4	6	5	4	47	42.72
Sussex	30	11	16	1	2	0	57	38.00
Somerset	24	6	11	6	1	0	42	35.00
Derbyshire	22	6	10	2	2	2	34	34.00
Warwickshire	28	8	15	0	2	3	40	32.00
Gloucestershire	28	8	17	1	1	1	42	31.11
Leicestershire	26	6	11	4	4	1	38	30.40
Northamptonshire	22	5	14	0	2	1	25	23.80
Glamorgan	22	1	18	1	1	1	7	6.66
Worcestershire	26	1	16	1	8	0	7	5.38
