= George Verity =

George Verity may refer to:

- George Matthew Verity (1865–1942), founder and first president of the American Rolling Mill Company (ARMCO)
- George M. Verity (towboat) (1927), American towboat
- George Douglas Verity (1933–2012), English cricketer, mountain climber, hotelier, and golfer
