= Boris Wilenkin =

English cricketer

Personal information
- Full name: Boris Charles Gregory Wilenkin
- Born: 20 June 1933; Belgravia, London, England
- Died: 18 March 2003 (aged 69); Oxford, Oxfordshire, England
- Batting: Right-handed
- Bowling: Right-arm (unknown)

Domestic team information
- Years: Team
- 1951–1956: Oxford University
- 1956: Cambridge University

Career statistics
Competition	First-class
Matches	16
Runs scored	661
Batting average	24.48
100s/50s	1/5
Top score	105
Balls bowled	3
Wickets	0
Bowling average	–
5 wickets in innings	–
10 wickets in match	–
Best bowling	–
Catches/stumpings	6/–
- Source: Cricinfo, 2 June 2019

Boris Charles Gregory Wilenkin (20 June 1933 – 18 March 2003) was an English first-class cricketer. He played first-class cricket for Cambridge University and the Free Foresters between 1956–59.

== Life and first-class cricket ==
Wilenkin was born at Belgravia in June 1933. He was educated at Harrow School, where he played for the school as an opening batsman for three years. He debuted in minor counties cricket for Oxfordshire against Buckinghamshire in the 1951 Minor Counties Championship. He carried out his national service as a second lieutenant with the Irish Guards in 1952. The following year he went up to Trinity College, Cambridge. While studying at Cambridge Wilenkin made his debut in first-class cricket for the Free Foresters against Cambridge University at Fenner's in 1955. He debuted the following year for Cambridge University, making ten first-class appearances for the university in 1956. He scored 512 runs in these ten matches, at an average of 30.11 and a high score of 105, made against Leicestershire. He played his final minor counties matches for Oxfordshire in 1956, having made 29 appearances in the Minor Counties Championship. He played further first-class matches for the Free Foresters in 1956, 1958 and 1959. He also appeared in two first-class matches for D. R. Jardine's XI in 1958.

In his later years he was the secretary of Oxford Downs Cricket Club. Wilenkin died at Oxford in March 2003.
