= Hedley Verity =

English cricketer (1905–1943)

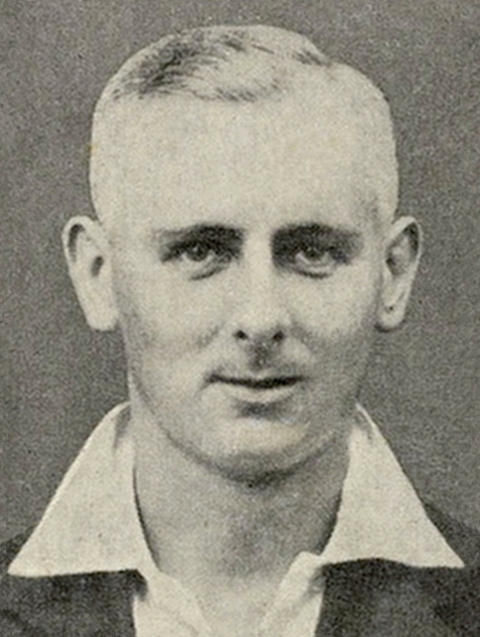

Personal information
- Full name: Hedley Verity
- Born: 18 May 1905; Headingley, Leeds, West Riding of Yorkshire, England
- Died: 31 July 1943 (aged 38); Caserta, Campania, Italy
- Batting: Right-handed
- Bowling: Slow left-arm orthodox
- Role: All rounder

International information
- National side: England
- Test debut (cap 262): 29 July 1931 v New Zealand
- Last Test: 27 June 1939 v West Indies

Domestic team information
- Years: Team
- 1930–1939: Yorkshire

Career statistics
Competition	Test	First-class
Matches	40	378
Runs scored	669	5,603
Batting average	20.90	18.07
100s/50s	0/3	1/13
Top score	66*	101
Balls bowled	11,173	84,219
Wickets	144	1,956
Bowling average	24.37	14.90
5 wickets in innings	5	164
10 wickets in match	2	54
Best bowling	8/43	10/10
Catches/stumpings	30/–	269/–
- Source: ESPNCricinfo, 1 September 2009

Hedley Verity (18 May 1905 – 31 July 1943) was a professional cricketer who played for Yorkshire and England between 1930 and 1939. A slow left-arm orthodox bowler, he took 1,957 wickets in first-class cricket at an average of 14.90 and 144 wickets in 40 Tests at an average of 24.37.

Named as one of the Wisden Cricketers of the Year in 1932, he is regarded as one of the most effective slow left-arm bowlers to have played cricket. Never someone who spun the ball sharply, he achieved success through the accuracy of his bowling. On pitches which made batting difficult, particularly ones affected by rain, he could be almost impossible to bat against.

Verity was born in Leeds and, from an early age, wished to play cricket for Yorkshire. After establishing a good reputation in local cricket, he signed a contract as a professional cricketer playing in the Lancashire League. His first season was not a success but, after moving clubs, he began to make a name for himself. Initially a medium-paced bowler, he switched to bowling spin in an attempt to secure a place in the Yorkshire team. When Wilfred Rhodes, the incumbent Yorkshire left-arm spinner, announced his retirement, Verity had a successful trial in the team in 1930, and led the national bowling averages. In 1931, his first full season, he achieved the rare feat of taking all 10 wickets in an innings, against Warwickshire; the following year, he again took all 10 wickets, against Nottinghamshire, while conceding just 10 runs. The latter bowling figures remain a record in first-class cricket for the fewest runs conceded while taking all 10 wickets. He established himself as part of a strong bowling unit, which helped Yorkshire win the County Championship seven times in his ten seasons with the club. In that time, Verity was never lower than fifth in the bowling averages and took over 150 wickets in every year except his first.

In 1931, he was chosen to play for England for the first time and rose to prominence during a tour to Australia in 1932–33. Afterwards, he played regularly for England and achieved the best performance of his career when he took 15 wickets against Australia in a Test match at Lord's in 1934. However, critics claimed he was ineffective on good batting pitches, and he was occasionally left out of the England team over the following years. Even so, he had one of the best records of any bowler against Donald Bradman, generally regarded as the greatest batsman in the history of cricket. Verity continued to play for Yorkshire and England until 1939, when the outbreak of the Second World War ended his career.

Verity joined the Green Howards in 1939, and after training was posted overseas to India, Persia and Egypt, achieving the rank of captain. During the Allied invasion of Sicily in 1943, he was severely wounded and captured by the Germans. Taken to the Italian mainland, he died in Caserta from his injuries and was buried there.

== Early years ==
Verity was born in Headingley, an area of Leeds, on 18 May 1905. He was the eldest child of Hedley Verity, who worked for a local coal company, and Edith Elwick, a Sunday school teacher. Verity also had two sisters, Grace and Edith. The family moved to Armley, then to the more rural location of Rawdon. From an early age, Verity watched Yorkshire play County Cricket matches at Leeds, Bradford and, during family holidays, Scarborough. Later, at Yeadon and Guiseley Secondary School, Verity played school cricket, bowling left-arm medium-paced deliveries; he maintained this style until 1929 and was capable of bowling both inswingers and outswingers. Verity left school aged 14 to work for his father, who had established a coal business in Guiseley, and played cricket for Rawdon's second team. Success on the field persuaded Verity to seek a career in professional cricket and a place in the Yorkshire team. While working for his father, he devoted increasing amounts of time to cricket practice.

In 1921, Verity made his debut for Rawdon in league cricket; some of his subsequent performances attracted the notice of the local press, and he took 29 wickets at an average of 13.80 that season. The following season, he was spotted by Yorkshire coach George Hirst and former England spinner Bobby Peel, who were talent scouting for Yorkshire, and given a trial in the cricket nets at Headingley. Peel realised Verity was an intelligent bowler who had excellent control of where he pitched the ball, but believed he was not fast enough to be effective for Yorkshire. Meanwhile, critics in Rawdon began to see increased potential in his batting, which improved steadily; by 1924, the Yorkshire Evening Post described Verity as "one of the most promising cricketers in the Leeds district".

Verity moved to play for Horsforth Hall Park in 1924, where his batting became more productive than his bowling. By 1926, when he scored a total of 488 runs and took 62 wickets to win the Yorkshire Council League prize for best junior bowler, his all-round potential secured a second trial at Yorkshire. Receiving coaching from Hirst, Verity played several matches for the Yorkshire Colts. He was given little bowling to do, suggesting that he was chosen more for his batting at this stage, and was near the bottom of the team's bowling averages. Yorkshire did not allocate him to a local club, their practice towards promising cricketers at the time. Hirst was nevertheless impressed by Verity and recommended him to Accrington Cricket Club, a team in the Lancashire League looking for a professional cricketer. After a trial, Verity signed a contract in September 1926.

== League professional ==
Verity was unsuccessful during the 1927 season, his only one with Accrington. His bowling was less effective than the club had hoped; he endured spells where he took few wickets and was unable to implement the tactics or bowl in the style that the club expected. His batting average for the season was 5.25. The team, containing players far more experienced than Verity, were unimpressed by his performances and unsympathetic to his difficulties, offering him little support in the field. Even so, the club were prepared to offer an improved contract for 1928, but he declined as Accrington had previously refused to release their players for county cricket. Verity signed a contract with Middleton, a club in the Central Lancashire Cricket League. Limited in resources, the club paid him less than Accrington, but guaranteed his release to play for Yorkshire if he were selected. Playing with young teammates, Verity worked hard to coach the players and develop team spirit.

He made a modest start in his first season, and was initially rated as a useful but unimpressive all-rounder. A visit to the Yorkshire nets around this time prompted Verity to alter his bowling style. Wilfred Rhodes, Yorkshire's main spinner since 1898, was considering retirement; he and Hirst suggested that, as there were fewer spinners than medium-pace bowlers, Verity was more likely to achieve selection if he switched to spin bowling. With the support of the Middleton team and committee, Verity started bowling spin at the beginning of the 1929 season and immediately began to attract attention from counties, culminating in an unsuccessful nets trial for Warwickshire. Later in the season, when Verity went to Headingley to watch Yorkshire play, he was asked to fill a vacancy in the Yorkshire Colts team. In the match, he took five wickets for seven runs in the second innings. By the end of the season, he had taken 100 wickets for Middleton and topped the Central Lancashire League bowling averages.

For the 1930 season, Verity received lucrative contract offers from several Lancashire League clubs, worth more than three times his Middleton salary. Although recently married and receiving little encouragement from the Yorkshire committee, he eventually rejected the offers. In the event, Middleton allowed Verity to play for Yorkshire during 1930 and later released him from his contract. Cricket historian Derek Hodgson notes that Verity's years in the Lancashire Leagues "meant that he reached Yorkshire ... as a hardened and experienced performer".

== County cricketer ==
=== First-class debut ===
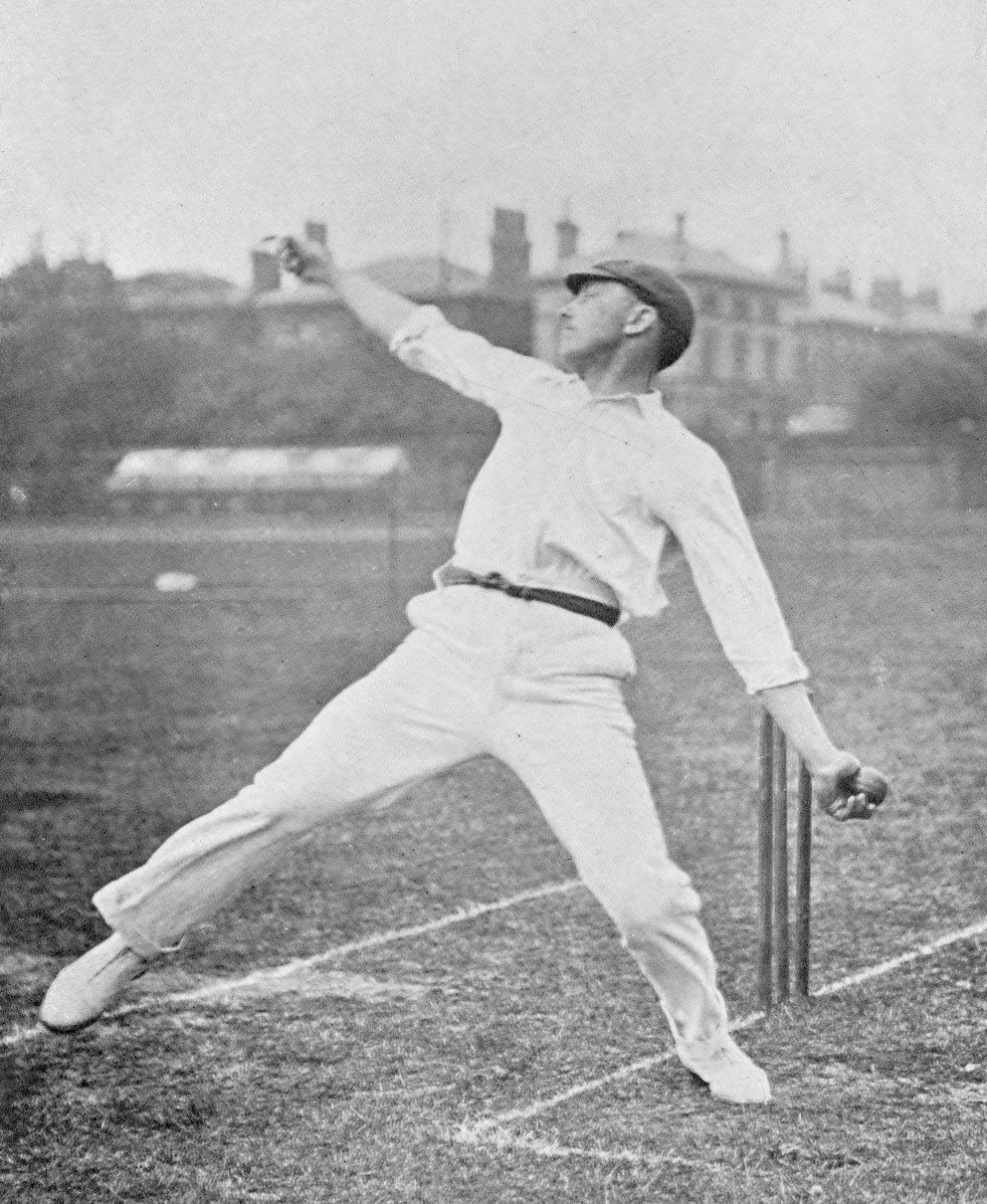
Wilfred Rhodes, Verity's predecessor as Yorkshire's left-arm spinner

Early in 1930, Wilfred Rhodes announced that he intended to retire from first-class cricket at the end of the season. Several spin bowlers were considered as his replacement; Hirst, who watched them all bowl in the nets, considered Verity the most impressive. Verity made his first-class debut on 21 May 1930 in an early-season non-Championship match against Sussex. Rhodes, who missed the match, spent the game watching Verity and seemed convinced afterwards that his successor had been found.

Bowling in two innings, Verity took three wickets for 96 in 46.1 overs; in the process, he won praise from the press, particularly for preventing the batsmen from scoring. Rhodes returned for the next match; Verity appeared only once more in May, taking eight wickets in the match against Leicestershire, and once in June. In his fourth game, he took nine for 60 in the second innings against Glamorgan and 12 wickets in the match. Rain had damaged the pitch, making it difficult to bat against spinners. After this, Verity played regularly alongside Rhodes, and, helped by a succession of rain-affected pitches, took a total of 64 wickets in 12 games at an average of 12.42, figures which placed him top of the national bowling averages. His best performance came against Hampshire when he took 13 wickets for 83 runs, including seven for 26 in the first innings.

Rhodes and Emmott Robinson, the senior professionals in the Yorkshire team, discussed tactics with Verity and his friend and teammate Bill Bowes, to analyse their errors. Bowes later wrote: "To Wilfred Rhodes and Emmott Robinson ... I owe most for what I learned of first-class cricket—and Hedley Verity shared my debt." Verity enjoyed long technical discussions with Rhodes and, according to Hirst, took in the advice "like a sponge takes water". Even successful performances were critiqued, including Verity's against Glamorgan and Hampshire. At the end of the season, critics in the press seemed convinced a successor to Rhodes had been found, and Verity was spoken of as a certainty to become an England regular.

=== Test debut ===
When the 1931 season started, many critics and journalists watched Verity closely to see how he compared to Rhodes. Their initial impressions were favourable as Verity took five for 42 against the Marylebone Cricket Club (MCC) in Yorkshire's first match of the season and five for 42 against Cambridge University. Then, in his fifth game, Verity became only the second man, after Alonzo Drake, to take all 10 wickets in a single innings for Yorkshire. Against Warwickshire, on his 26th birthday, Verity took 10 for 36 in the second innings, having taken three wickets in the first innings, to give Yorkshire an innings victory.

Verity followed this performance with five for 54 against Lancashire, but a week after his 10 wickets against Warwickshire, Frank Woolley hit four sixes from Verity's bowling as the Yorkshire bowler conceded 70 runs from 12 overs without taking a wicket. The rest of his season was successful. Favoured by pitches made receptive to his bowling by rain, he recorded impressive performances, earning selection for the Players against the Gentlemen at Lord's, where he took five wickets in the Gentlemen's first innings. He was also selected in the less prestigious Gentlemen v Players fixtures at The Oval and Scarborough and was awarded his county cap by Yorkshire. Having been watched by England selectors, and after taking 11 wickets for Yorkshire in their match against the touring New Zealand team, Verity was selected in the final two Test matches of the series between England and the tourists. The first match was drawn after the New Zealand team performed above expectations and England brought in four new players, one of whom was Verity. On his debut, he took four wickets for 75 runs in the game. The Cricketer noted room for improvements in his technique but observed he could spin the ball well. England won the match and Verity was retained for the final Test. However, rain disrupted the match and he did not bowl. In his first full season of first-class cricket, Verity took 188 wickets at an average of 13.52, finishing on top of the Yorkshire bowling averages and second in the national averages. Yorkshire won the County Championship and, according to Wisden, owed much of their success to Verity's bowling. Verity was selected as one of Wisden's Cricketers of the Year for his performances in the season. However, the citation said that despite his success and ability, he needed to improve the variety in the pace and flight of his bowling.

=== World record ===
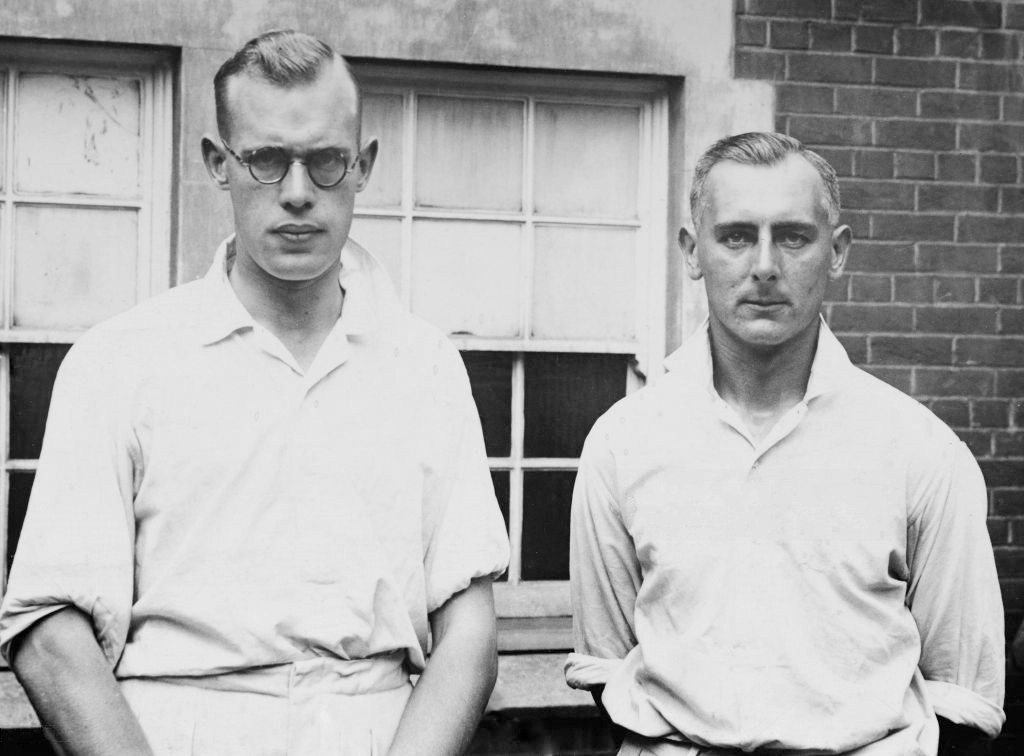
Bowes and Verity in 1932

Yorkshire made a poor start to the 1932 season. The team lost heavily to Lancashire, for whom Eddie Paynter scored 152 runs and hit Verity for five sixes. Although Verity had figures of eight for 107, he was expected to be more successful as the pitch conditions were perfect for spin bowling. Neville Cardus wrote that his figures were "bad for the pitch. He can spin the ball keenly enough, but lacks a plan in his control of length. Moreover, he seldom gets the batsman guessing while the ball is in the air." However, Yorkshire improved their form in the rest of the season to retain the County title. Between them, Verity and Bowes took 352 wickets in the season, and Verity took 162 wickets at an average of 13.88 to finish second in the national bowling averages.

Verity's best performance of the season came at Headingley on 12 July, the third and final day of Yorkshire's match against Nottinghamshire. After heavy rain on the second day, Brian Sellers, the Yorkshire captain, closed his team's innings while they still trailed by 71 runs. When Nottinghamshire began their second innings, Verity did not concede any runs from his first nine overs. Subsequently, the pitch became difficult to bat on as it dried in the sun and Verity took all 10 wickets while 10 runs were hit from his bowling. Making the ball spin sharply, he took seven wickets in 15 deliveries, including a hat-trick. His bowling figures of 10 for 10 beat the previous record for fewest runs conceded while taking all 10 wickets, (Note: The previous best figures were 10 for 18 by George Geary in 1929.) and remain the best bowling analysis in first-class cricket. He is the only Yorkshire bowler to take all 10 wickets in an innings on two separate occasions. Yorkshire won the match by 10 wickets. Despite Verity's success, he was not selected for any Gentlemen v Players matches, nor in the Test match against India. His only representative cricket came in a Test trial at the end of July, in which he did not bowl as the match was washed out by rain.

Verity had been advised by friends at the start of the season that he would need an exceptional performance to achieve selection on the 1932–33 Ashes tour of Australia; Alan Hill believes the performance against Nottinghamshire guaranteed Verity would be chosen to tour. In the middle of August, Verity was one of the last men added to the MCC team captained by Douglas Jardine. (Note: The MCC were responsible for the administration of English cricket, including the England Test team. The England team toured under the MCC name and playing colours.)

== International cricketer ==
=== Bodyline tour ===
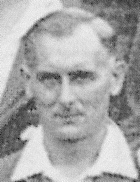
Verity during the Bodyline tour

Jardine planned to use Verity to contain the batsmen and prevent them scoring runs, while the fast bowlers rested. However, Verity was not expected to be a big success on the tour. The good batting conditions, the aggressive Australian approach to playing spin bowlers and Verity's lack of experience led critics to dismiss his potential contribution to the English bowling attack, but Verity had a successful start to the tour. Assisted by overnight rain, he took seven for 37, including the wicket of Don Bradman, against a Combined XI, comprising some of the best Australian players. In the following game, against South Australia, Verity took eight wickets, including five for 42 in the second innings. By now, the press had begun to pay attention to Verity's achievements, and former Australian batsman Clem Hill expressed his admiration for Verity.

Selected for the first Test on the strength of his early tour performances, Verity bowled just 17 overs in the game, mainly being used to give the fast bowlers a rest. He did not take any wickets and Verity himself believed he had bowled poorly. England won the match, using bodyline tactics which had first been used earlier in the tour. After the Test, the tourists travelled to Tasmania to play two matches against the state team. Verity played in the second, and although rain interrupted play, restricting Verity to five overs, he scored his first half-century in first-class cricket. However, he was left out of the team for the second Test and was replaced by Bill Bowes. England played four fast bowlers but Jardine had misjudged the playing surface; the Australian spinners were very effective on a slow-paced pitch and Australia levelled the series.

Verity regained his place in the team for the third Test, replacing Bowes. The match was highly controversial owing to England's continued and increased use of bodyline tactics. Verity's main contributions to the match came from his batting: he shared partnerships worth over 90 runs in both innings, scoring 45 runs in the first innings and 40 in the second. He took one wicket in the game; after 16 wicketless overs in the first innings, Verity dismissed Bradman in the second, his first Test wicket against Australia, and England won the match by 338 runs. After the third Test, the MCC played New South Wales again. Rain before the beginning of the third day affected the pitch; Bradman, possibly irritated by a minor show of bravado from Verity, scored 71 in conditions which should have been perfect for the Yorkshireman, who took only two wickets. During the fourth Test, Verity took few wickets but Wisden noted that he kept a good length and prevented the Australian batsmen scoring quickly. His batting was important once more. In their first innings, England had lost eight wickets, and were still 76 runs behind Australia's score when Verity joined Paynter, who had left a hospital bed where he had been confined with tonsillitis. The two men scored 92 runs together, to give England a small lead. Verity scored 23 not out in two-and-three-quarter hours, although he was lucky not to be dismissed several times. Australia were bowled out in their second innings and Verity took two wickets; England scored the required runs to record a six-wicket win which ensured victory in the series—and the Ashes. Verity's bowling was most successful in the final Test, when Jardine allowed him to depart from his role of restricting the batsmen's scoring and bowl a more attacking line and length in an attempt to take wickets. Having taken three for 62 in Australia's first innings, he took five for 33 in the second, assisted by a worn pitch that helped him to spin the ball. He dismissed Bradman for 71 and later took two wickets with successive deliveries.

In the Test series, Verity totalled 11 wickets at an average of 24.65, second in the bowling averages to Larwood. (Note: Tommy Mitchell appeared in one match and would be second in the averages if he were included, having taken three wickets for 60 runs.) Verity took three more wickets in his last matches of the tour, which included his appearance in one of the two Tests against New Zealand at the end of the tour. In all first-class games in Australia, he took 44 wickets at 15.86, leading the first-class bowling averages for the tourists; he took one further wicket in New Zealand. Wisden's tour report noted Verity's "fine bowling record" and that he performed well. Jardine, in a letter to Verity's father, wrote: "Hedley has come through his first tour triumphantly, no mean feat to start with the stiffest tour, but particularly for a slow left-hander. On and off the field, Hedley has been a real friend and a grand help to me".

=== Series against West Indies ===
In the 1933 season, when Yorkshire won their third consecutive County Championship, Verity took 190 wickets at an average of 13.43 to be fifth in the national averages; in eight matches he took 10 or more wickets, and achieved five wickets in an innings 18 times. In seven consecutive innings, he secured a total of 50 wickets, becoming only the third player to achieve this feat in first-class cricket. (Note: The other two players were Tich Freeman and Charlie Townsend.) He also scored over 600 runs in the season, his highest aggregate to date, including three fifties—his first in English first-class cricket. Verity represented the Players against the Gentlemen and played in the first two of three Tests against the West Indies, taking four for 45 in the first match and capturing seven wickets at an average of 21.85 in the series. He was left out of the final game in favour of Charles Marriott, but in two other games against the tourists, Verity took a total of 22 wickets. Against Essex, Verity achieved another record by taking 17 wickets in a single day's play, the second of three players to achieve this feat, on a pitch damaged by rain. (Note: Colin Blythe, in 1907, and Tom Goddard, in 1939, are the only other bowlers to take 17 wickets in one day.) In contrast, against Surrey, Yorkshire conceded 560 runs and Verity, frustrated at the lack of a declaration, first bowled extremely negatively and then bowled two underarm deliveries that the umpire called no-ball as Verity had not informed the batsmen of his intention. This was an unusually public reaction for Verity and his captain ordered him to resume normal bowling. At the end of the season, an MCC team toured India and played Tests there for the first time. Jardine was chosen as captain, and Verity was the only other player from the Bodyline series to tour, although others declined an invitation.

=== Tour of India ===
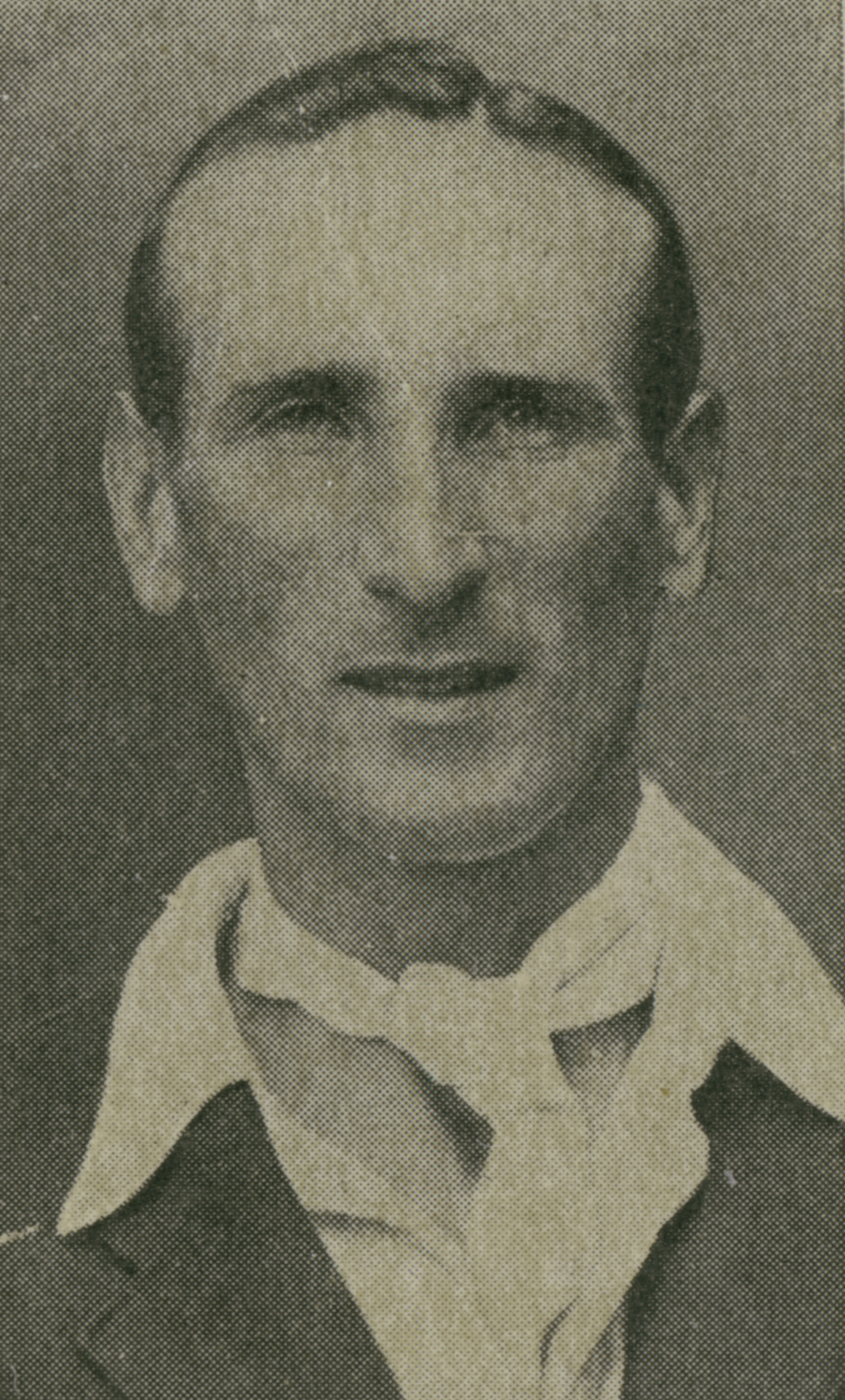
Douglas Jardine, Verity's captain in Australia and India, was an admirer of Verity.

Jardine approached the tour with a competitive attitude and made thorough preparations. The match attendances were high and the public followed the cricket very closely. Verity enjoyed the tour and established a lasting friendship with Charlie Barnett; Verity helped Barnett to overcome his homesickness and to develop his understanding of cricket. Verity was the leading first-class wicket-taker on the tour, although he was second in the team averages, with 72 wickets at an average of 15.54. In the first match of the tour against Sind, he took six for 46 and 10 wickets in the game. His best figures were seven for 37 against the Viceroy's XI and he took five wickets in an innings on five occasions. Against an Indian XI, he achieved his then-highest first-class score of 91 not out. On the same ground, in the second Test match, Verity took eight wickets in the drawn game and scored 55 not out, his maiden Test fifty. As England had won the first Test, the third and final match would decide the series. Verity was again successful with the bat, scoring 42 and sharing a partnership of 97 with Jardine. Then with the ball, Verity took seven for 49 as the Indian batsmen struggled against his accuracy. Four wickets in the second innings gave him eleven wickets for 153 in the match, the first time he had taken 10 or more wickets in a Test match. In the three Tests, Verity took 23 wickets at an average of 16.82, leading the bowling averages for the series.

Jardine, who retired from regular first-class cricket after the tour, had little patience with his fast bowlers on the tour. On one occasion, when they were having difficulty in the heat, Jardine said: "Thank God we have one bowler in the side"—referring to Verity. The two men admired each other greatly. Verity was impressed with the depth of Jardine's thinking on the game and his intelligence, enjoying tactical discussions with him on the voyage to Australia. According to Alan Hill, Verity did not relish the Bodyline tactics on that tour but supported his captain's stance completely. Verity even named his second son Douglas after Jardine. Jardine considered Verity to be the best slow left-arm bowler of all time, writing: "I venture to doubt whether any other bowler of his type has proved such a master on all kinds of wickets ... No captain could have a greater asset on his side than Verity. He would make a great captain himself." Historian David Frith writes that Verity was "probably the cricketer [Jardine] admired above all others", while Bob Wyatt believed the two men were very similar in outlook, temperament and desire to succeed.

=== Series against Australia in 1934 ===
In the 1934 season, Verity took 150 wickets at an average of 17.63, placing him third in the national averages. That year, the Australians toured England and Verity was selected for all five Test matches. Australia won the first game—Verity took two wickets. At Lord's, in the second match, England scored 440 in their first innings but after the second day's play, Australia were well positioned, having reached 192 for two wickets. Verity was the only bowler to trouble the batsmen and caught and bowled Bradman, who had scored a quick 36 runs. After rain fell overnight, the pitch changed to become helpful to spin; Wisden reported that: "although the wicket certainly helped [Verity] considerably it could scarcely be described as genuinely sticky except for one period after lunch." On the third day, Australia lost their last eight wickets while scoring 92 runs. Verity took six of the wickets to achieve bowling figures of seven for 61. The tourists just failed to score enough runs to make England bat again and were forced to follow on: Cardus wrote: "Verity settled the issue like a great bowler". England wicket-keeper Les Ames believed this was crucial to an England victory, or the home team would have batted in very difficult conditions. When Australia batted again, Verity took eight for 43, dismissing Bradman a second time, to give him match figures of 15 for 104; 14 of the wickets came on the third day. Cardus believed the Australian batsmen played very badly against Verity's spin, while the Wisden correspondent wrote: "This amazing achievement would probably have been only possible to a man possessed of such length and finger-spin as Verity ... Verity's length was impeccable and he made the ball come back and lift so abruptly that most of the Australians were helpless. The majority of them had had no experience in England of such a pitch, and they showed no ability or skill in dealing with bowling like that of Verity under these conditions; their efforts at playing back were, to say the least, immature." Afterwards, this game became known in cricket circles as "Verity's match"; it was the only occasion in the 20th century when England beat Australia at Lord's, and their last such win for 75 years.

The third match was played on a very good pitch for batting in extremely hot weather, and England did not have a strong bowling attack in the view of Wisden. England scored 627, of which Verity scored 60 not out; Wisden commented that he batted slowly but well. Australia replied with 491 when they batted; Verity took four for 78 in 53 overs and was able to prevent the batsmen scoring quickly. The match was eventually drawn. Cardus, in criticising the English bowlers in the game, wrote: "Verity is apparently the only England bowler in existence at the present time—and he is not subtle on a hard wicket." Poor weather prevented an English defeat in the fourth Test, as Bradman and Bill Ponsford shared a partnership of 388 runs; Verity took three wickets but, in doing so, conceded 113 runs. The final, decisive game, was won by Australia, who therefore regained the Ashes. Bradman and Ponsford this time scored 451 runs together as their team totalled 701; Verity was wicketless in the match and conceded 166 runs. Cardus, assessing the English bowling, regretted that England did not have a bowler capable of flighting the ball, a role usually performed by left-arm spinners. Verity took 24 wickets in the series at 24.00, finishing second in the averages. Reviewing the series, Wisden editor Sydney Southerton wrote, "Verity, apart from his one amazing performance at Lord's, could be complimented upon his steadiness rather than upon his effectiveness on hard wickets". Verity also made other representative appearances in the season; Yorkshire dropped to sixth position, handicapped by the limited appearances of four players who were regularly absent at representative matches.

=== Career in the mid-1930s ===
During the 1935 season Yorkshire regained the County Championship, and Verity passed 200 wickets for the first time in his career, taking 211 at an average of 14.36 to finish third in the national averages. He took five wickets in an innings 22 times and had 10 or more wickets in seven matches. South Africa played England in a five-Test series that year and won the series 1–0. (Note: All Test matches in England, except those involving Australia, were played over three days; it was argued after this series that Tests between England and South Africa should be extended to four days to allow more time for a result.) Verity was selected in the first four games. In the first, his figures were three for 52 in 41 overs on a pitch which assisted spin bowlers. England were in a position of dominance when rain ruined the game. Shortly afterwards, the tourists defeated Yorkshire; in the second innings, Jock Cameron hit 30 runs from a single over bowled by Verity. Arthur Wood, the Yorkshire wicket-keeper, commented during the over: "Go on, Hedley, you have him in two minds. He doesn't know whether to hit you for four or six!" South Africa won the second Test match, their first Test win in England, although Verity took six wickets in the match. In the third game, Verity had bowling figures of two wickets for nine runs from 25 overs in the match and in the fourth, he took one for 72 from 40 overs. These two games were drawn, leaving England needing a victory in the final match. By now, Verity had acquired a reputation for being unable to take wickets on good batting pitches. In the report on the fourth Test, Wisden's correspondent observed: "Verity again failed to worry South Africa's batsmen". With victory essential, Verity was dropped for the last match. He was replaced by off-spinner Johnnie Clay, regarded by critics as effective at flighting the ball. The Times correspondent wrote: "Verity has not been impressive on firm wickets: he seems to have checked suddenly in a career which promised so well three seasons ago, and it is not surprising that he has been left out of this side." Nevertheless, he took 12 wickets at 20.83, leading the Test bowling averages for England. Verity was not selected in any other representative cricket that season.

The Yorkshire team played three first-class matches in Jamaica in early 1936. Yorkshire won the first game, Jamaica's first defeat at home in a first-class game for 10 years. Verity took 10 for 106 in 57 overs. The other matches, played on very good batting wickets, were drawn. In the final game, Verity scored 101, his only first-class century. Batting aggressively, he hit 10 fours and his second fifty runs came in just over an hour. In total, Verity took 16 wickets, averaging 22.50, and scored 195 runs at 48.75.

In the 1936 English season, in which Yorkshire finished second to Derbyshire in the Championship, Verity took 216 wickets, the highest seasonal total of his career, at an average of 13.18, which placed him second in the national averages. Against Kent, he returned nine wickets for 12 runs and took 15 wickets in the game, one of seven games in which he captured 10 or more wickets. In addition, he scored his highest aggregate of runs, accumulating 855 runs at an average of 31.66; at one point, Verity led the Yorkshire batting averages. Playing for his county against the Indian touring team, Verity achieved his highest first-class innings in England with 96 not out. He played in all three Test matches against India, a team which failed to live up to expectations and suffered internal divisions. G. O. B. "Gubby" Allen, the England captain, won the toss in the first Test and bowled first on the advice of Verity, but the latter was less successful than expected and Allen later described this as one of the few occasions he saw him bowl poorly. India established a first innings lead, but were bowled out for 93 in their second innings and easily lost the match; Verity took four for 17. The second Test was a draw in which he took four for 41 in the first innings and scored 66, his highest Test score. England won the final Test to take the series 1–0; Verity took four wickets in the game. In the series he took 15 wickets at an average of 15.20, finishing top of the England bowling averages. He also appeared for the Players against the Gentlemen and in a Test trial for the North against the South. Regarded as a certainty to tour Australia during the 1936–37, Verity was among the first seven players selected and his name was announced before the second Test against India.

=== Second tour to Australia ===
Under the captaincy of Allen, Verity began the tour well. He took 16 wickets before the Tests began with best figures of five for 50 against Queensland, his only five wicket haul of the Australian leg of the tour. England won the first two Tests of the series, assisted by poor weather which altered pitch conditions in their favour. In the first match, England scored 358 and bowled Australia out for 234. Although Verity took just one wicket, Wisden's correspondent praised him, reporting: "Among the bowlers ... Verity must not be forgotten. In the first innings he bowled in his best form and contributed to many of [Bill] Voce's wickets ... So difficult was Verity to score from that batsmen in desperation tried to get runs off Voce, with disastrous results to themselves." After England set Australia 381 to win, rain damaged the pitch; Allen and Voce bowled the home team out for 58. In the second Test, England won by an innings, again assisted by rain. Verity took three wickets in the match, including that of Bradman.

The turning point of the series was the third Test. On the first day, Verity again dismissed Bradman and the England bowlers performed well in good batting conditions before rain altered the state of the pitch. Australia declared their innings closed at 200 for nine and after losing nine wickets for 76, England also declared, hoping to make Australia bat on a still-difficult pitch. In much easier batting conditions, Australia made 564, of which Bradman scored 270. Verity bowled nearly 38 eight-ball overs and took three for 79. Cardus wrote: "Verity was magnificent ... In his absence Bradman might have scored another 100 runs. Nothing but consummate length and flight could have checked Bradman, in circumstances made for Bradman ... Every run from Verity had to be earnt. It was beautiful bowling, delightful to the eye and intellect." Wisden's report said: "Voce and Verity were outstanding England bowlers. The latter kept an immaculate length and allowed no batsman to take liberties with him." England were bowled out for 323 and lost the game.

In an attempt to solve their problem in finding a reliable opening partnership in the series, England promoted Verity to open the batting in the fourth Test. After Australia were bowled out for 288, Verity and Barnett put on 53 runs together, England's best opening partnership of the series. Wisden praised Verity's defence but said he had not solved the problem of finding a partner for Barnett. England scored 330 but Australia's second innings of 433 left England needing 392. Barnett and Verity began with a stand of 45, but England lost by 148 runs. In two innings, Verity scored 19 and 17, but was wicketless in the match. Having levelled the series, Australia won the final match by a large margin to take the series 3–2. Verity took just one wicket in the match. In the series, he took 10 wickets at an average of 45.50; in all first-class matches in Australia, he captured 28 wickets at 30.75 and secured 10 wickets at 18.20 in two matches in New Zealand at the end of the tour. The Wisden report on the tour said: "Verity admirably performed the task of keeping one end closed and took high honours for his consistently good work." The Times correspondent, noting the failure of the wrist spinners selected to tour, wrote: "Australia ... beat us because they have spin bowlers who make the ball truly spin. Verity certainly never had a wicket on which to demonstrate his art, so exposing the fact that real spin bowling does not at the moment exist in England."

During the 1937 season, Verity played only one of the three Tests against the touring New Zealanders. He took two wickets, and although batsmen found it difficult to score from his bowling, he did not look dangerous and was left out of the remaining Tests in an attempt to strengthen the English bowling attack. He was not selected for the Players and his only other representative cricket was for the North against the South and for teams selected from those who had toured Australia during the English winter. Nevertheless, Verity took 202 wickets at 15.67 which placed him third in the bowling averages.

=== Ashes series of 1938 ===
Verity took 158 first-class wickets in 1938 at an average of 15.38, placing him third once more in the national averages; Bowes was second in the list and Yorkshire retained the Championship. After appearing in a trial match, Verity played in all four Tests against Australia, (Note: One match was abandoned owing to rain.) during a series which was tied 1–1. In the first match, England scored 658 and according to Wisden, the new England captain Wally Hammond decided to keep Verity in reserve in the expectation of making Australia follow-on; he bowled just 45 balls in Australia's first innings. Australia did follow-on, and in the second innings, Verity bowled 62 overs to take three wickets for 102, bowling very accurately, but the batsmen played him skilfully and the match was drawn. In the second match, Verity took four for 103 out of an Australian total of 422, in reply to England's 494. After Verity had taken two wickets in eight balls, Australia were in danger of having to follow-on, but Bill O'Reilly struck him for two consecutive sixes to remove the possibility. Verity took two wickets in the second innings, but the match was drawn. After the third match was abandoned owing to rain, Australia won the fourth Test, held at Headingley, by five wickets to ensure the Ashes were retained. Wisden commented that: "At no time was the wicket easy for batting and Australia won largely because they possessed better spin bowling." Verity took two wickets in the match, but some critics believed his bowling could have won the match had Hammond used him more effectively. In a match where the Australian spinner O'Reilly took 10 wickets, Hammond used his fast bowlers Bowes and Ken Farnes for the majority of both innings. Commentators believed Hammond over-used his fast bowlers; Cardus wrote: "Hammond's faith in fast bowling rather exceeded his faith in the arts of Verity and Wright. The result was sad disillusionment." Barnett also said that Hammond refused to allow Verity to alter his bowling tactics, when the Yorkshire bowler wished to aim for a worn area on the pitch.

As neither side had established a winning lead in the series, the final match at The Oval was to be played to a finish, no matter how long it took. England scored a record team total of 903 runs and Australia were heavily defeated. Verity, one of five Yorkshire players in the team, bowled 12 overs in the game and took two wickets. He also played a part in the achievement of Len Hutton, who scored 364 runs, breaking the record for the highest individual innings in a Test match. As Hutton's innings began to assume epic proportions, Verity stayed with him throughout the intervals, helping him to maintain concentration. On the Sunday of the match, when there was no play, Verity arranged for Hutton to have a break by the sea to relax away from cricket. Hutton commented: "I owe [Verity] the kind of debt that one can never fully repay ... His quiet, natural dignity was an immense source of strength to me throughout those long hours". The series was drawn; Verity took 14 wickets at an average of 25.28, finishing second in the England bowling averages, behind Bowes. However, Charlie Barnett, who played in the series but disliked Hammond, believed that Hammond's poor tactical use of Verity cost England potential victories in the second and fourth Tests. Verity played no other representative cricket that season, but appeared once more against the Australians for H. D. G. Leveson-Gower's team which defeated the tourists by 10 wickets.

=== Tour to South Africa and final season ===
In the winter of 1938–39, Verity toured South Africa with the MCC team under Hammond's captaincy. He took 47 wickets at 19.93 in first-class games. In the first game of the tour, Verity took 11 wickets against Griqualand West. In the Test matches, the batsmen played in a negative fashion, despite pitches that were very good for batting. High scoring games left the bowlers with expensive figures and Verity had the best bowling average on either side, bowling accurately and reliably. He played in all five Test matches, taking 19 wickets at 29.05. The first two matches were drawn: in the first innings of the opening Test, he took four for 61 in 44 eight-ball overs; in the first innings of the second Test, he took five for 70 in nearly 37 overs. England won the third match, the only result in the series and the fourth was also drawn. The final game was to be played without a time limit until there was a winner; after 10 days it had to be abandoned as the MCC had to catch a boat home. The match established a record at the time for the total number of runs scored in a first-class game, as both teams combined to post an aggregate of 1,981 runs. Verity took four wickets and bowled 766 balls in the game, establishing a new record for deliveries in a first-class game. It proved difficult to score runs from Verity's bowling but the batsmen generally were very cautious.

Verity's final first-class cricket came in the 1939 season which was overshadowed by the forthcoming war. Yorkshire won their third successive County Championship and the seventh of Verity's career. Verity took 191 wickets at an average of 13.13, to top the bowling averages for the second time in his career. Verity's only representative cricket came in the first Test match against West Indies, when he took two wickets in the match. He was subsequently left out of the team for the second Test in favour of Tom Goddard, and did not play any more Test matches. However, Wisden's report on the third Test commented that his absence and that of several other bowlers left the English attack weaker. In a career total of 40 Tests, Verity took 144 wickets at an average of 24.37 and scored 669 runs at an average of 20.90. With much of the end of the cricket season abandoned prior to the expected outbreak of war, Verity played his last match against Sussex. In the second innings, Verity took seven wickets for nine runs on a rain-affected pitch to bowl Sussex out for 33 and take Yorkshire to a win, although the match was played in a strained, tense atmosphere. This was Verity's last performance in first-class cricket. In total, he had taken 1,956 wickets at an average of 14.90 and scored 5,603 runs at 18.07.

== Style and technique ==
As a bowler, Verity delivered the ball at almost medium pace, faster than usual for a spinner. R. C. Robertson-Glasgow, a cricket writer and journalist, wrote "He is a scholarly bowler ... He is tall, and much stronger than his pace needs. His run up, longer than most of his kind, has a measured delicacy that you would expect from this fastidious and nearly prim craftsman. Only his delivery has a grace which mathematics can't explain." His main asset as a bowler was an ability to bowl straight and with great accuracy, on a good length. He could also make the ball bounce sharply. His most effective delivery curved through the air, pitched on middle and leg stump and spun away from the batsman, causing many of them to edge the ball into the slips. On rain-affected pitches he bowled more slowly, and was almost unplayable at times. However, the period in which Verity played was notable for good batting pitches, and batsmen often dominated. In these conditions, Verity prevented batsmen scoring runs and constantly tried new strategies to try to take wickets. Verity also used different types of delivery to keep batsmen uncertain: he could bowl at a slower and faster pace to his normal style and occasionally bowled a much faster ball which regularly took wickets.

Verity never spun the ball very far, particularly after his second tour to Australia, and preferred to concentrate on bowling a good length. However, critics did not think that Verity posed enough of a threat to batsmen and could be dull to watch. By the middle of his career, he had a reputation for being ineffective on good batting pitches, and was occasionally dropped from the England team for his lack of effectiveness. Even so, he only missed one Test against Australia and one against South Africa, the two strongest Test playing teams, after he made his debut. Verity believed his performances in unfavourable conditions for his bowling had greater merit than his successes in favourable ones. He once said: "Do not praise me when I have taken 8 for 20 on a sticky wicket, but when I have got 2 for 100 on a perfect wicket." At times, Verity almost seemed bored when bowling and performed less effectively, particularly if his side were winning without needing his contribution. Bowes once told the Yorkshire captain, Brian Sellers, that the way to get the best out of Verity was to tell him that everything depended on him.

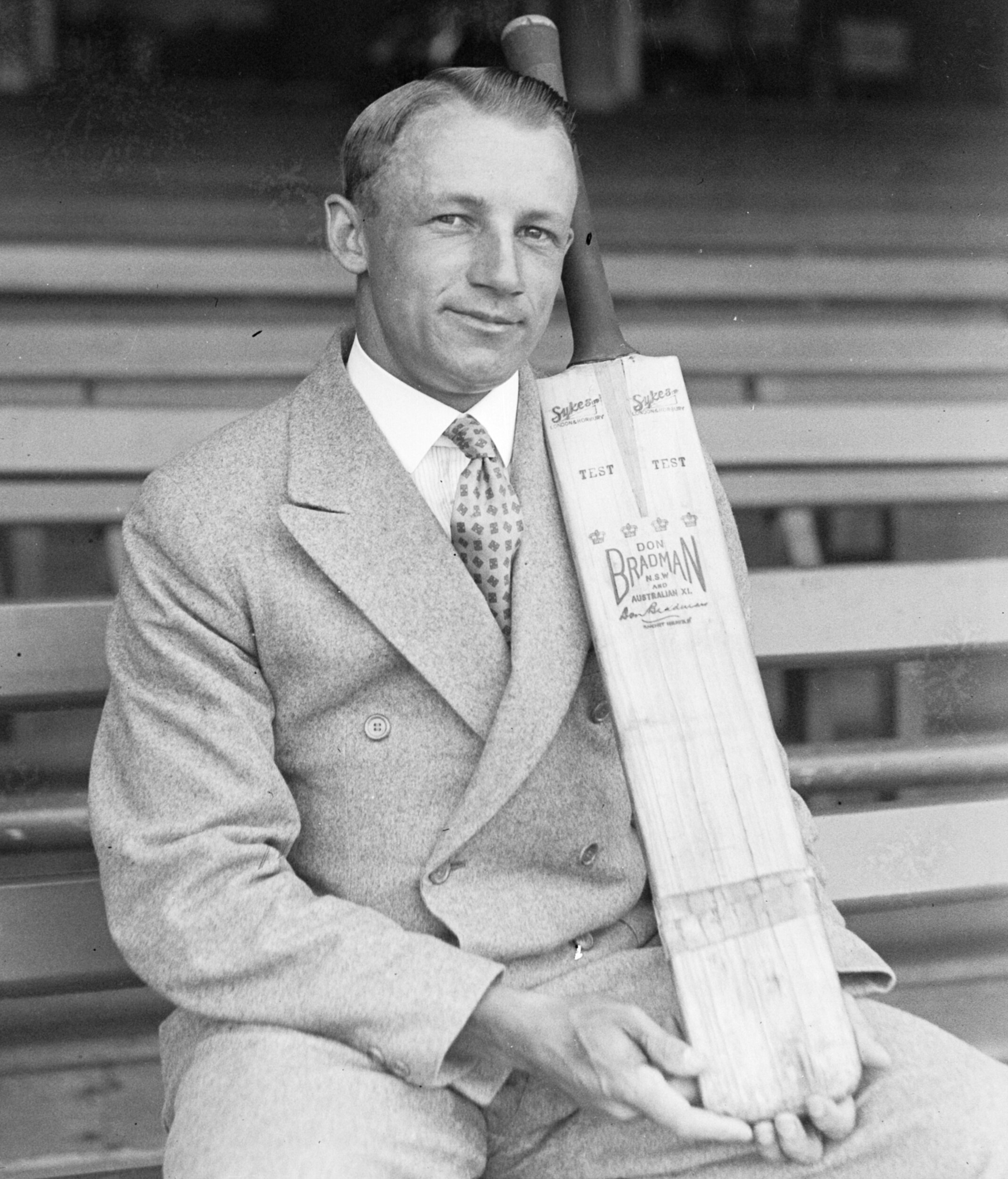
Donald Bradman, whose wicket Verity took more times than anyone else in Test matches, and who greatly respected Verity as a bowler.

Verity earned the respect of Bradman, generally regarded as the greatest batsman to have played cricket, and enjoyed bowling at him. Bradman described Verity as a great cricketer and wrote that throughout their respective careers, he "grew more and more to respect [Verity] both as a gentleman and as a player." Robertson-Glasgow thought that Verity was "one of only three or four bowlers who came to the battle with Bradman on not unequal terms". During the 17 Tests in which they faced each other, Verity dismissed Bradman eight times, more than any other bowler. Robertson-Glasgow believed that, but for Verity, Bradman would have averaged over 150 in Tests instead of his actual batting average. (Note: Robertson-Glasgow was referring to matches between Australia and England. At the time he wrote, Bradman averaged 91.42 against England. He eventually averaged 89.78 against England and 99.94 overall.) In all first-class cricket, Verity dismissed Bradman 10 times in total, on two occasions twice in the same game. Only Clarrie Grimmett equalled 10 first-class dismissals of Bradman. However, Bradman once said: "I think I know all about Clarrie (Grimmett), but with Hedley I am never sure. You see, there's no breaking-point with him."

Verity is often cited as one of the greatest slow left-arm spinners to play the game. Robertson-Glasgow wrote: "We can only say that, in his own short time, he was the best of his kind." The writer considered Verity may not quite have achieved the heights of some other great bowlers of his type, but "as a workman-artist, he will take some beating." Douglas Jardine rated him higher than any previous Yorkshire spinners, and Les Ames considered him the best left-arm spinner he had played against. Bradman wrote: "Undoubtedly he was one of the greatest slow left-handed spinners of all time. His record testifies to that. No Australian left-hander of that type was Verity's equal and of the Englishmen I saw ... there is no doubt that Hedley was as good or better than the others."

As a batsman, Verity occasionally showed potential to become good, making one first-class century during his career, but concentrated his energy on bowling. He modelled his batting on Herbert Sutcliffe, and Robertson-Glasgow wrote: "As a batsman, he looks like Sutcliffe gone stale. That is, pretty good."

== Military service ==
=== Training with the Green Howards ===
Since around 1937, Verity had expected the outbreak of the Second World War and had prepared for it through reading military literature. He and Bowes decided to enlist together, and after briefly serving in the Air Raid Precautions in Guiseley until Bowes' wife gave birth, they attempted to join the infantry. However, Bowes was hampered by an old knee complaint and later became a gunnery officer. After serving as a sapper in the Royal Engineers, Verity was commissioned in January 1940 as a second lieutenant in the Green Howards, and later promoted to captain. Following a spell at the Infantry Training Centre, he was posted to the 1st Battalion. He served at the regimental depot in Richmond, North Yorkshire, where he was responsible for training recruits. In the spring of 1941, the battalion moved to Omagh in Northern Ireland for further training. Verity's Yorkshire and England teammate Norman Yardley was also in the 1st Battalion; the fame of these cricketers made an impression on the local population. Playing several cricket matches, Verity frequently took wickets on rough pitches that were unsuitable for batting. There was even time for his appearance in a charity match at Lord's. In August, he returned to England and after a spell in London, he was posted overseas.

The 1st battalion of the Green Howards transferred early in 1942 to Ranchi in India, where the climate badly affected Verity's health. After suffering from dysentery, he was weak and his doctors wished to send him home. However, he resumed his position and, by the end of the year, his battalion was sent to Persia. In March 1943, the battalion was posted to Kibrit Air Base in Egypt for training and then to Qatana in Syria. Here, preparations were finalised for the Allied invasion of Sicily. Verity remained below peak fitness and was struggling a little owing to his age. His commanding officers planned to withdraw him from front-line fighting and move him to a staff position at headquarters once the Sicily campaign had concluded.

=== Death ===
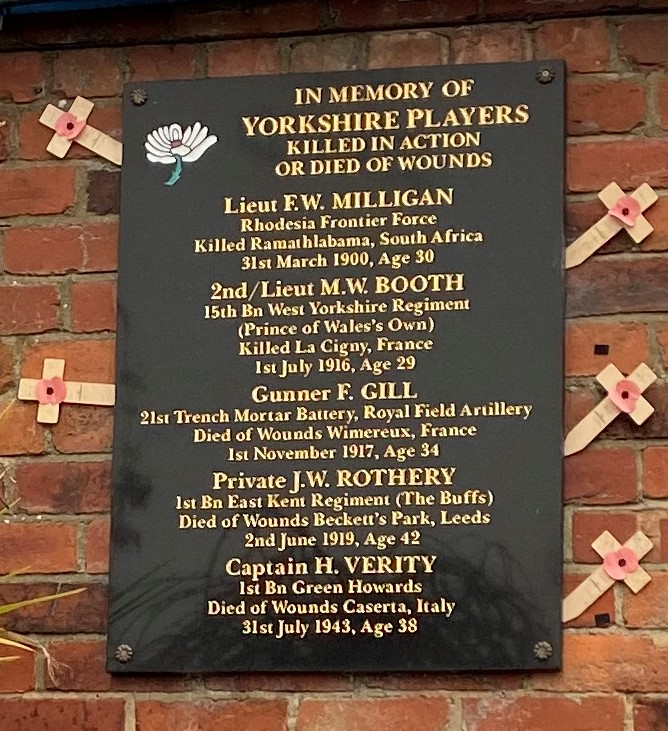
War Memorial at Headingley Stadium

The invasion of Sicily was initially successful until the Allied forces reached the plains outside Catania, where German forces put up strong resistance. The Green Howards, as part of the 15th Brigade, made a night attack on 19 July. However, conditions were more difficult than expected and the brigade came under heavy fire. Verity commanded B Company, which was surrounded in the confusion. Attempting to secure the position, Verity was hit in the chest by shrapnel and had to be left behind as the company retreated. The last order he gave was "keep going".

Severely wounded and subsequently captured by the Germans, Verity was taken to a field hospital and underwent an operation. Taken by boat across the Strait of Messina to the Italian mainland, Verity first went to a hospital in Reggio Calabria and was then transported for two days by train to Naples. The German hospital was full, so Verity was sent to the Italian hospital at Caserta. By this stage, Verity was very ill and had another operation to relieve pressure from his rib onto his lung. The operation seemed successful but Verity deteriorated rapidly over the following three days, bleeding heavily. He died on 31 July, and was buried with full military honours. His grave was later moved from the town's cemetery to the military cemetery established by the Commonwealth War Graves Commission.

Bradman wrote in an obituary: "I cannot ever recall hearing Verity utter a word of complaint or criticism ... if reports of his final sacrifice be correct ... he maintained this example right to the end." When first-class cricket resumed in 1945, Yorkshire staged a memorial match for Verity against Lancashire at Bradford Park Avenue, which resulted in a draw. Later, several Yorkshire players visited his grave; some members of the MCC team under Len Hutton's captaincy in 1954–55, including Hutton, journalists and former Yorkshire player Abe Waddington paid tribute there while en route for Australia.

== Personal life ==
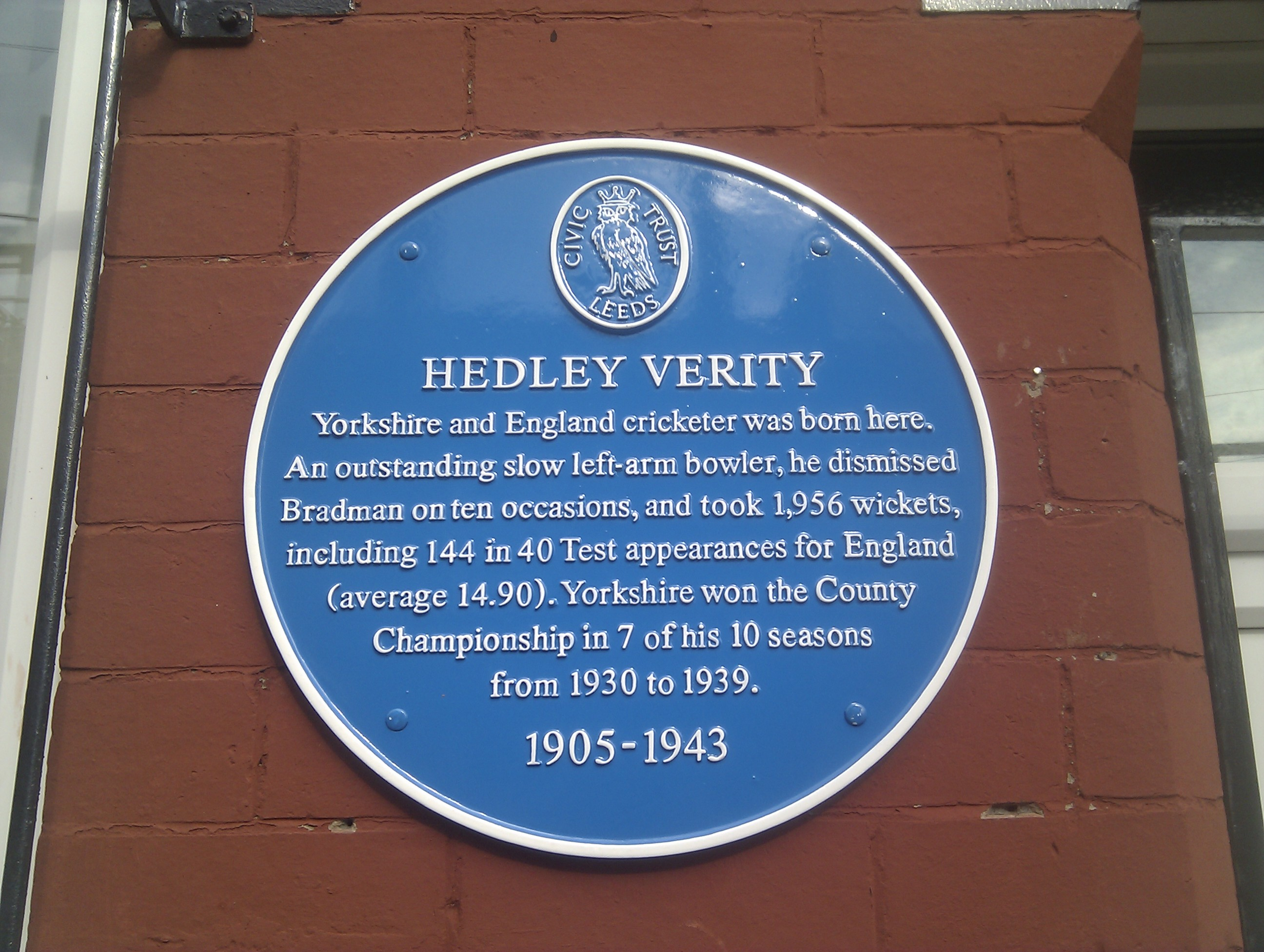
Hedley Verity Blue Plaque

Verity married Kathleen Alice Metcalfe, a bookbinder and the daughter of a sales agent, on 7 March 1929. The two had known each other as children in Headingley and met again at a Rawdon youth club social event. They had two sons, first Wilfred, named after Wilfred Rhodes, and then George Douglas, named after George Hirst and Douglas Jardine.

Shortly before the outbreak of the war, Kathleen Verity began to suffer from poor health, and the family planned a trip to South Africa in the English winter of 1939 to aid her recovery and so Verity could take up one of several offers of a coaching job. In the last months before Hedley Verity went overseas during the war, Kathleen joined him in Omagh and later in London just before he went away.

The Hedley Verity, a branch of Wetherspoons in Leeds city centre, is named after Verity and there is a Blue plaque on the house he was born in.

== Bibliography ==
- Bowes, Bill (1949). Express Deliveries. London: Stanley Paul.
- Cardus, Neville (1934). Good Days. A Book of Cricket. London: Jonathan Cape.
- Cardus, Neville (1982). The Roses Matches 1919–1939. London: Souvenir Press. ISBN 0-285-62520-9.
- Douglas, Christopher (2002). Douglas Jardine: Spartan Cricketer. London: Methuen. ISBN 0-413-77216-0.
- Frith, David (2002). Bodyline Autopsy—The Full Story of the Most Sensational Test Cricket Series: Australia v England 1932–33. London: Aurum Press. ISBN 1-85410-896-4.
- Hill, Alan (2000). Hedley Verity. Portrait of a Cricketer. Edinburgh and London: Mainstream Publishing. ISBN 1-84018-302-0.
- Hodgson, Derek (1989). The Official History of Yorkshire County Cricket Club. Ramsbury, Marlborough, Wiltshire: The Crowood Press. ISBN 1-85223-274-9.
- Robertson-Glasgow, R. C. (1943). Cricket Prints: Some Batsmen and Bowlers, 1920–1940. London: T. Werner Laurie.
- Swanton, E. W. (1999). Cricketers of My Time. London: Andre Deutsch. ISBN 0-233-99746-6.
- Woodhouse, Anthony (1989). The History of Yorkshire County Cricket Club. London: Christopher Helm. ISBN 0-7470-3408-7.
