= Douglas Jardine =

British cricket player and team captain (1900-1958)

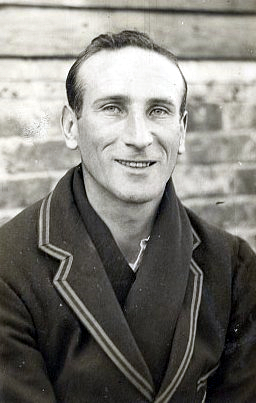
- Jardine in 1932

Personal information
- Full name: Douglas Robert Jardine
- Born: 23 October 1900; Malabar Hill, Bombay, Bombay Presidency, British India
- Died: 18 June 1958 (aged 57); Montreux, Vaud, Switzerland
- Nickname: The Iron Duke
- Batting: Right-handed
- Bowling: Right-arm leg break
- Role: Top-order Batsman

International information
- National side: England
- Test debut (cap 235): 23 June 1928 v West Indies
- Last Test: 10 February 1934 v India

Domestic team information
- Years: Team
- 1920–1923: Oxford University
- 1921–1933: Surrey
- 1925–1933/34: Marylebone Cricket Club

Career statistics
Competition	Test	First-class
Matches	22	262
Runs scored	1,296	14,848
Batting average	48.00	46.83
100s/50s	1/10	35/72
Top score	127	214
Balls bowled	6	2,582
Wickets	0	48
Bowling average	–	31.10
5 wickets in innings	0	1
10 wickets in match	0	0
Best bowling	0/10	6/28
Catches/stumpings	26/–	188/–
- Source: ESPNcricinfo, 17 May 2008

Douglas Robert Jardine (23 October 1900 – 18 June 1958) was a cricketer who played 22 Test matches for England, captaining the side in 15 of those matches between 1931 and 1934. A right-handed batsman, he is best known for captaining the English team during their successful 1932–33 Ashes tour of Australia. During that series, England employed "Bodyline" tactics against the Australian batsmen, headed by Donald Bradman, wherein bowlers pitched the ball short on the line of leg stump to rise towards the bodies of the batsmen in a manner that some contemporary players and critics viewed as intimidatory and physically dangerous. As captain, Jardine was the person responsible for the implementation of Bodyline.

A controversial figure among cricketers, partially for what was perceived by some to be an arrogant manner, he was well known for his dislike of Australian players and crowds, and thus was unpopular in Australia, especially so after the Bodyline tour where his continued use of dangerous bowling tactics injured a number of opposing players and was considered to be contrary to the 'spirit of cricket' that English cricketers aspired to. However, many who played under his leadership regarded him as an excellent and dedicated captain. He was also famous in cricket circles for wearing a multi-coloured Harlequin cap.

After establishing an early reputation as a prolific schoolboy batsman, Jardine played cricket for Winchester College, attended the University of Oxford, playing for its cricket team, and then played for Surrey County Cricket Club as an amateur. He developed a stubborn, defensive method of batting which was considered unusual for an amateur at the time, and he received occasional criticism for negative batting. Nonetheless, Jardine was selected in Test matches for the first time in 1928, and went on to play with some success in the Test series in Australia in 1928–29. Following this tour, his business commitments prevented him from playing as much cricket. However, in 1931, he was asked to captain England in a Test against New Zealand. Although there were some initial misgivings about his captaincy, Jardine led England in the next three cricket seasons and on two overseas tours, one of which was the Australian tour of 1932–33. Of his 15 Tests as captain, he won nine, drew five and lost only one. He retired from all first-class cricket in 1934 following a tour to India and he was advised that, due to his continued use of Bodyline tactics and subsequent civil unrest in India in response, he would no longer be appointed as the English captain.

Although Jardine was a qualified solicitor he did not work much in law, choosing instead to devote most of his working life to banking and, later on, journalism. He joined the Territorial Army in the Second World War and spent most of it posted in India. After the war, he worked as company secretary at a paper manufacturer and also returned to journalism. While on a business trip in 1957, he became ill with what proved to be lung cancer and died, aged 57, in 1958.

== Early life ==
Douglas Jardine was born on 23 October 1900 in Bombay, British India, to Scottish parents, Malcolm Jardine—a former first-class cricketer who became a barrister—and Alison Moir. At the age of nine, he was sent to St Andrews in Scotland to stay with his mother's sister. He attended Horris Hill School, near Newbury, Berkshire, from May 1910. There, Jardine was moderately successful academically, and from 1912, he played cricket for the school first eleven, enjoying success as a bowler and as a batsman. He led the team in his final year, and the team were unbeaten under his captaincy. As a schoolboy, Jardine was influenced by the writing of former England captain C. B. Fry on batting technique, which contradicted the advice of his coach at Horris Hill. The coach disapproved of Jardine's batting methods, but Jardine did not back down and quoted a book by Fry to support his viewpoint.

In 1914, Jardine entered Winchester College. At the time, life for pupils at Winchester was arduous and austere; discipline was harsh. Sport and exercise were vital parts of the school day. In Jardine's time, preparing the pupils for war was also important. According to Jardine's biographer, Christopher Douglas, the pupils were "taught to be honest, practical, impervious to physical pain, uncomplaining and civilised." All pupils were required to be academically competent and as such Jardine was able to get along satisfactorily without exhibiting academic brilliance; successful sportsmen, on the other hand, were revered. Jardine enjoyed a slightly better position than some pupils, already possessing a reputation as a very fine cricketer and excelling at other sports; he represented the school at football as a goalkeeper and rackets, and played Winchester College football. But it was at cricket that he particularly excelled. He was in the first eleven for three years from 1917 and received coaching from Harry Altham, Rockley Wilson and Schofield Haigh, the latter two of whom were distinguished cricketers. In 1919, his final year, Jardine came top of the school batting averages with 997 runs at an average of 66.46. He also became captain despite some doubts within the school about his ability to unify the team. Under Jardine, Winchester won their annual match against Eton College in 1919, a fixture in which Eton had usually held the upper hand. Jardine's batting (35 and 89 in the match) and captaincy were key factors in his side's first victory over Eton for 12 years. Years later, after his retirement from cricket, he named his 89 in that match as his personal favourite innings. Jardine went on to score 135 not out against Harrow School.

Jardine's achievements in the season were widely reported in the local and national press. He played two representative matches, for the best schoolboy cricketers, at Lord's Cricket Ground, scored 44, 91, 57 and 55 and won favourable reviews in the press. Wisden, in 1928, described Jardine at this time as being obviously of a much higher standard than his contemporaries, particularly in defence and on side batting. However, he was criticised for being occasionally too cautious and not using all the batting strokes of which he was capable—his good batting technique gave the impression that he could easily score more quickly if he so desired.

== First-class career ==
=== Oxford University ===
Jardine entered New College, Oxford, in September 1919 at a time when the university was more crowded than usual due to the arrival of men whose entrance had been delayed due to the war. He took part in several sports, representing New College as goalkeeper in matches between the colleges, and being given a trial for the university football team, although he was not chosen. He continued to play rackets and began to play real tennis, making such progress and showing such promise that he went on to represent the university successfully and won his Blue. In cricket, Jardine came under the coaching of Tom Hayward who influenced his footwork and defence. Wisden commented in 1928 that Jardine had come with an excellent reputation, but did not quite achieve the success which was expected. His batting ability, particularly defensively, remained unquestioned.

In the 1920 season, Jardine made his first-class debut, played eight first-class matches and scored two fifties. Playing mainly as an opening batsman, he won his Blue, appearing in the University Match against Cambridge but fell short of expectations, and continued to be criticised for over-caution with the bat. In all, he scored 217 runs at an average of 22.64. In the match for Oxford against Essex, he took six wickets for six runs in a bowling spell of 45 balls, bowling leg breaks, to have bowling figures of six for 28. It was the only occasion in his career where he took five or more wickets in an innings.

Playing more confidently and fluently in 1921, Jardine began the season well, scoring three fifties in his first three first-class matches. Oxford then played against the Australian touring side which dominated the season. In the second innings, Jardine scored 96 not out to save the game but was unable to complete his century before the game ended. The innings was praised by those who saw it and the Australians were criticised in the press for not allowing Jardine to reach his hundred, particularly as the match had been reduced from three days to two at their request. They had tried to help him with some easy bowling but the situation was confusing as batsmen's scores were not displayed on the ground's scoreboard. Some critics have speculated that this incident led to Jardine's later hatred of Australians, although Christopher Douglas does not believe this. Cricket historian David Frith believes that Australian captain Warwick Armstrong may have addressed sarcastic comments to Jardine but Wisden blamed Jardine himself for batting too slowly to score a century. The Australian manager expressed regret that he missed out. This innings was the highest that had been played to that point in the season against the Australians, and only one higher score was made before the first Test. Consequently, Plum Warner, an influential figure who had recently captained Middlesex, suggested in The Cricketer magazine that Jardine should play for England in the first Test, which followed the Oxford match. Warner had been previously impressed by Jardine. The latter remained in Test contention for a short time, but was not selected. In the meantime, he scored his maiden first-class hundred against The Army and another followed against Sussex. Both innings were cautious, with defence his main priority for much of the innings, but he failed in the match against Cambridge.

Jardine played for Surrey, for whom he was qualified, in the remainder of the season. He replaced the injured Jack Hobbs as an opening batsman before dropping down the order to number five on Hobbs' return. In a situation of great pressure, Jardine scored a vital 55 in an important match against reigning County Champions Middlesex, although Surrey lost the game. Jardine finished the season with 1,015 first-class runs at an average of 39.03, although critics argued that he was still yet to fulfill his full potential.

Jardine missed most of the 1922 season owing to a serious knee injury; he played only four matches at a time when he was expected to make a big impression. He missed Oxford's match against Cambridge and was unable to play for Surrey at all that season. Even so, in 1922 he was selected by The Isis as one of its men of the year. After some problems with his troublesome knee, Jardine returned to cricket by May of the 1923 season. He was not given the Oxford captaincy in his final year, which has led to later speculation that his manner and unfriendliness was held against him. However, his persistent injury and the availability of other deserving candidates may have provided some of the explanation. Jardine gradually found his batting form, and contributed to Oxford's only win over Cambridge in the decade. During one innings of another match, he received criticism for using his pads to stop the ball from hitting the wickets: this was fully within the laws of the game but was considered controversial, being seen by critics to be against the spirit of the game. Christopher Douglas traces Jardine's hostility towards the press and critics to this incident. He also received criticism for his slow batting for Oxford, again being singled out due to his known ability to play attacking shots. Partly this was because Jardine held a responsible position, with the team often reliant on his personal success. The complaints against him were a manifestation of wider criticism of young amateur batting at the time for its supposed lack of verve and enterprise, as older commentators began to hark back to the "golden age" before the war. Jardine left Oxford in 1923 having scored a total of 1,381 runs and was awarded a fourth class degree in modern history.

When Jardine went on to play for Surrey that season, and now in an already strong batting side, he played with more freedom. Batting at number five, he had to adapt his style depending on the match situation. He was successful, playing either long defensive innings or sacrificing his innings in an attempt to hit quick runs. His captain Percy Fender retained him in the role for the rest of the season. He scored his first century for Surrey against Yorkshire and was awarded his County Cap, making 916 runs at an average of 38.16 in the whole season.

=== County cricketer ===
Once Jardine left Oxford, he began to qualify as a solicitor while still playing for Surrey. He made steady progress over the next three seasons but was overshadowed by other amateur batsmen. His contemporaries at Oxford and Cambridge attracted more attention in the press, as did the next generation of amateur batsmen. He was appointed vice-captain to Fender for the 1924 season. Several professionals, such as Jack Hobbs, could have been made vice-captain, but Jardine was preferred as an amateur. In that season, Jardine was selected for the Gentlemen v Players match for the first time and came third in the Surrey averages. In all first-class matches, he scored 1,249 runs at an average of 40.29. In the following season, Jardine was less successful, scoring fewer runs at a lower average and with a highest score of 87 (1,020 runs at 30.90). Suggestions made in the press that Jardine should captain the Gentlemen with a view towards the future of the England Test team, were ignored. In the event, owing to an ankle injury sustained playing village cricket, he was unable to appear in the Gentlemen v Players match at Lord's. In 1926, Jardine had his most successful season to date, with 1,473 runs (average 46.03), although he was again overshadowed by other players and by the attention given to the Ashes series being played. Towards the end of the season, his batting became more attractive and his rate of scoring increased as he began to play more attacking shots. His assurance and judgement against all bowling, even international bowlers, increased and he scored 538 runs in his final ten innings.

In 1927, Jardine achieved his highest average in a season, scoring 1,002 runs and averaging 91.09 in a very wet summer which led to difficult wickets to bat on. Wisden named him as one of its Cricketers of the Year, commenting that he had improved his style and footwork. That season, he only played 11 matches due to work commitments as a clerk with Barings Bank, for whom he had worked since qualifying as a solicitor. Despite his comparative lack of practice, he scored centuries in his first three matches and came top of the Surrey batting averages. He scored a century in the Gentlemen v Players match, which impressed influential observers at Lord's, and represented England in a trial match against The Rest. In this latter match, when Percy Chapman withdrew at the last minute, Jardine took over the captaincy, earning praise in the press for his performance. By this stage, he was considered a certainty to tour Australia the following winter.

=== Test cricketer ===
Jardine's batting performance in 1928 was similar to that from the previous season. He played 14 matches, scoring 1,133 runs at an average of 87.15. He was successful in high-profile matches, scoring 193 for Gentlemen at the Oval, where the crowd had booed his slow start (at one stage, he took half an hour to score two runs) but later cheered him as his last fifty runs were scored in half an hour. For the same team at Lord's, he scored 86 and 40. He captained The Rest against England in a Test trial and made the highest score in each innings, scoring 74 not out in the fourth innings to help his team to draw the game on a difficult pitch, against international bowlers Maurice Tate and Harold Larwood.

Immediately after this match, Jardine made his Test debut against the West Indies who were touring England that season. This was West Indies' first ever Test match. The team possessed several fast bowlers who had enjoyed some success on the tour of England. Many batsmen only played them with difficulty, particularly on the occasional fast-paced pitch, but Jardine played them confidently. Jardine played in the first two Tests, both of which were won by England by an innings, but missed the third for reasons that were not revealed. He scored 22 on his debut, but was more successful in the second Test, scoring 83. During this innings, when he had scored 26, he accidentally hit his wicket when setting off for a run but was given not out. At the time, the laws of the game stated that a batsman was not out if he had completed his shot and was setting off for a run; the West Indian cricketer Learie Constantine believed that Jardine was only given not out because he told the umpire his shot was complete. Later, while he was batting with Tate, a player with whom he did not have a good relationship, Jardine was run out when Tate refused to go for a run.

=== First tour to Australia ===
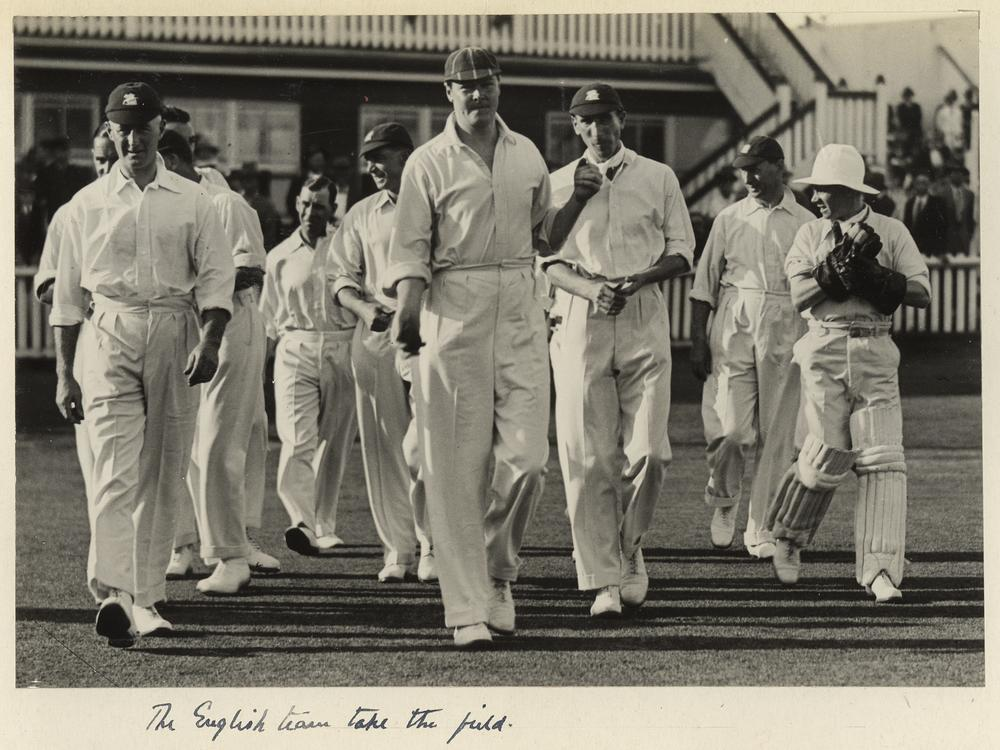
The England side emerging onto the field during the first Test at Brisbane in 1928–29. Jardine is third from the right.

Jardine was selected to tour Australia with the M.C.C. team in 1928–29 as part of a very strong batting side, playing in all five Test matches and scoring 341 runs at an average of 42.62. In all first-class matches, he scored 1,168 runs (average 64.88). He was also on the five-man selection committee for the tour, which chose teams to play in specific games but had not chosen the touring party. Wisden judged that he had been as great a success as had been expected and impressed everyone with the strength of his defensive shots and his play on the back foot. It said that he played some delightful innings. Percy Fender, covering the tour as a journalist, believed that Jardine never had the chance to play a normal innings in the Test, having to provide the stability to the batting, and often seeming to come out to bat in a crisis.

Jardine was the centre of attention at the start of the tour. He began the tour with three consecutive hundreds and was seen as one of the main English threats. In his first hundred, the crowd engaged in some good-natured joking at Jardine's expense, but he was jeered by the crowd in his second hundred for batting too slowly. His third hundred was described by Bradman as one of the finest exhibitions of strokeplay that he had seen; Jardine accelerated after another slow start, during which he was again barracked, to play some excellent shots. The crowds took an increasing dislike to him, partially for his success with the bat, but mainly for his superior attitude and bearing, his awkward fielding, and particularly his choice of headwear. His first public action in South Australia was to take out the members of the South Australian team who had been to Oxford or Cambridge Universities. Then, he wore a Harlequin cap, given to people who played good cricket at Oxford. It was not unusual for Oxford and Cambridge cricketers to wear similar caps while batting, as both Jardine and M.C.C. captain Percy Chapman did so on this tour, although it was slightly unorthodox to wear them while fielding. However, this was neither understood nor acceptable to the Australian crowds. They quickly took exception to the importance he seemed to place on class distinction. Although Jardine may simply have worn the cap out of superstition, it conveyed a negative impression to the spectators, with his general demeanour drawing one comment of "Where's the butler to carry the bat for you?" Jardine's cap became a focus for criticism and mockery from the crowds throughout the tour. Nevertheless, Jack Fingleton later claimed that Jardine could still have brought the crowds onto his side by exchanging jokes or pleasantries with them. It is certain that Jardine by this stage had developed an intense dislike for Australian crowds. During his third century at the start of the tour, during a period of abuse from the spectators, he observed to a sympathetic Hunter Hendry that "All Australians are uneducated, and an unruly mob". After the innings, when Patsy Hendren said that the Australian crowds did not like Jardine, he replied "It's fucking mutual". Due to the large number of good close fielders in the side, Jardine did not field in the slips, his usual position for Surrey, but next to the crowd on the boundary. There, he was roundly abused and mocked, particularly when chasing the ball: he was not a good fielder on the boundary. In one of the Test matches, he spat towards the crowd while fielding on the boundary as he changed position for the final time.

In the first Test, Jardine scored 35 and 65 not out. His first innings began with England in an uncertain position, having lost three wickets for 108 on a very good batting wicket. His innings led England to a stronger position. He played very cautiously, being troubled by Clarrie Grimmett and Bert Ironmonger, the Australian spinners. Jardine believed that Ironmonger threw the ball, and this bowler gave him considerable trouble throughout his career. Thanks to the bowling of Harold Larwood, England took a huge first innings lead. In his second innings, although he played well in his 65, Jardine was not under much pressure. He scored a large number of singles, giving his partners most of the bowling and building up the lead to the point where England achieved a massive victory by 675 runs. This victory surprised and troubled the Australian cricketing public. Jardine played a similar role in the second Test, batting with Wally Hammond to retrieve a poor start for England in his only innings as they won by eight wickets. Jardine scored 62 in the third Test, supporting Hammond who made a double century. However, when Australia batted a second time, they built up a big lead and left England needing 332 to win on an exceptionally bad wicket which had been damaged by rain. Jack Hobbs and Herbert Sutcliffe, in one of their most famous partnerships, put on 105. Hobbs sent a message to the team that Jardine should be the next batsmen to come in, even though he usually batted later on, as he was the batsman most likely to survive in the conditions. When Hobbs was dismissed, Jardine came in to bat. He survived, although finding batting exceptionally difficult, until the day's play ended. Percy Fender believed that Jardine was the only batsman in the side who could have coped with the difficult conditions. He went on to make 33 next day, and England won by three wickets.

During the team's brief visit to Tasmania, Jardine made his highest first-class score of 214. In the fourth Test, Jardine only scored one run in the first innings, before he was given out leg before wicket (lbw) despite obviously hitting the ball. In the second innings, coming out to bat with the score 21 for two, Jardine scored 98 in a partnership of 262 with Hammond which was then the highest partnership for the third wicket in all Test matches. The scoring was very slow, and the crowd protested throughout Jardine's innings, even though he scored faster than Hammond. He was out when Wisden believed he looked certain to reach a century. England went on to win the match by 12 runs.

Jardine was not successful in the final Test, won by Australia. He was used as an opener, due to an injury to Sutcliffe, and made just 19 and a first ball duck. Once both of his innings were completed, on the fifth day of a match which lasted eight days, he left the match and set off across Australia to catch a boat to India for a holiday. It is not clear if this was planned or if he had simply had enough. Jardine never provided an explanation, to the Australian press nor afterwards. Later, Jardine wrote about the Australian crowds, complaining over their involvement, but praising their knowledge and judgement of the game and describing them as more informed than English crowds. He also expressed later reservations to Bob Wyatt about Percy Chapman, saying that he would have shot him if a gun was available. Jardine did not appear in first-class cricket in the 1929 season due to business commitments.

== England captain ==
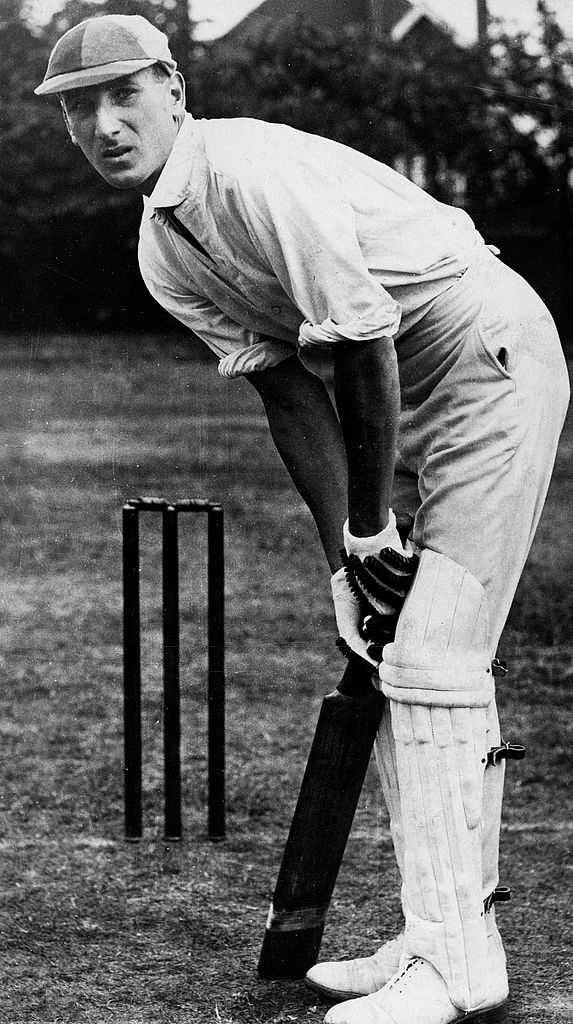
Jardine in 1930

=== Appointment as captain ===
At the beginning of the 1930 season, Jardine was offered the vice-captaincy of Surrey. He was unable to accept owing to business commitments and played just nine matches for the season, scoring 402 runs at an average of 36.54 and managing one century and one fifty. He was never in the running for Test selection that season, although his presence may have been missed as the English batting was unreliable in the Tests. Christopher Douglas argues that had Jardine been playing regularly, he would have been made captain for the final Test, when Chapman was dropped in favour of the sounder batsman Bob Wyatt. The sensation of the Test series was Donald Bradman, who dominated the English bowling to score 974 runs with unprecedented speed and certainty, making the English selectors realise that something must be done to address his skill. With Bradman at the fore, Australia regained the Ashes 2–1.

Jardine played a full season of cricket in 1931. In June, he was appointed as captain for the Test against New Zealand (two more Tests were later added). The English selectors were searching for possible captains for the 1932–33 tour of Australia, with Bradman and Australia's strong batting line up foremost in their minds. Christopher Douglas believes that, as Jardine was not a regular county captain, the selectors wanted to assess his leadership ability but had probably not settled on him as a final choice. He was also chosen as a dependable, proven batsman. While Percy Fender approved of his appointment, The Times' correspondent believed that he was unproven and others were more deserving of the leadership. Ian Peebles, writing 40 years later, claimed that Jardine's appointment was popular but cricket administrators had misgivings. Alan Gibson believed that Jardine was chosen because the other candidates were either not worth their place in the side, too old or had controversy attached to them. Furthermore, Jardine impressed the chairman of selectors, Pelham Warner, who stated that he was very effective in selection meetings through his knowledge of cricket history and went into great detail to choose the correct players; it seems that Warner was the driving force behind Jardine's appointment.

In his first Test as captain, Jardine clashed with several players. Frank Woolley was unhappy with his captain's manner, feeling humiliated at his treatment in the field at one point. He also rebuked Ian Peebles and Walter Robins, two young amateur bowlers, for their amusement over an incident in the match. The home team's fortunes were mixed, as New Zealand put up a very good fight in their first Test in England, and both sides could have won. The New Zealanders were so successful that a further two Tests were arranged. Jardine was criticised in the press for not instructing his batsmen to score quickly enough to win in the fourth innings, although this strategy was unlikely to succeed, and the match was drawn. England won the second Test by an innings and the third Test was drawn, sealing the series 1–0. Jardine had a top score of just 38 in the series, but only batted four times and was not out in three of the innings. At the beginning of the following season, Wisden's editor believed that, as Jardine had failed to impress (unspecified) people with his captaincy, he was no longer a certainty to lead the side to Australia, and only Percy Chapman's lack of form prevented his reinstatement at Jardine's expense. As a batsman, Jardine was more impressive in Wisden's opinion, showing himself to be good in defence despite his lack of cricket in the past two seasons. A notable innings was his 104 for The Rest to prevent defeat against champion county Yorkshire. The opposition bowling, particularly from Bill Bowes, was short and hostile, but Jardine survived for over four hours. He scored 1,104 first-class runs for the season at an average of 64.94.

At the beginning of the 1932 season, Jardine became captain of Surrey. There was much speculation that Fender had been replaced due to disputes with the Surrey committee but it was some time before this, and Jardine's appointment, was confirmed. Fender was supportive of Jardine and happy to play under him. Jardine overcame a cautious beginning to develop a more aggressive captaincy style, and Surrey finished in their highest position in the championship for six years. England played one international match that season, India's first ever Test match, and Jardine was selected as captain. India possessed a very effective bowling attack on this tour, which surprised many teams, and England's batsmen struggled against them. Jardine, who had played a long innings against the tourists for M.C.C. earlier in the season, was the only English batsman to pass 30 in both innings. He scored 79 and 85 not out, and was praised for two excellent defensive innings in a difficult situation by Wisden and The Cricketer. During the match, Jardine again clashed with his team. He gave Bill Bowes and Bill Voce the very unusual instruction to bowl one full toss each over to take advantage of the batsmen's trouble seeing the ball against the crowd. The bowlers did not do so, and were later reprimanded by Jardine who told them to obey orders. Jardine himself went on to score 1,464 runs in the season at an average of 52.28.

=== Planning for the 1932–33 tour ===
A week after the Test, it was announced that Jardine would captain the M.C.C. team to Australia that winter, although he seemed to have had last minute doubts about accepting. Others were also concerned about whether he was the best choice. For example, Rockley Wilson is reputed to have said that with Jardine as captain, "We shall win the Ashes ... but we may well lose a Dominion". However, the selectors thought that a determined leader was needed to defeat the Australians and a more disciplined approach than that of Percy Chapman on the previous tour was needed. Jardine began to plan tactics from this point, discussing ideas with various people. He was aware that Bradman, Australia's star batsman and the main worry of the selectors, had occasionally shown vulnerability to pace bowling. During the final Test of the 1930 Ashes at the Oval, during Bradman's innings of 232, the wicket became difficult for a time following rain. Bradman was briefly seen to be uncomfortable facing deliveries that bounced higher than usual at a faster pace. Percy Fender was one of many cricketers who noticed, and he discussed this with Jardine in 1932. When Jardine later saw film footage of the Oval incident and noticed Bradman's discomfort, he shouted, "I've got it! He's yellow!" Further details that developed his plans came from letters Fender received from Australia in 1932 describing how Australian batsmen were increasingly moving across the stumps towards the off-side to play the ball on the on-side. Fender showed these letters to Jardine. It was also known in England that Bradman had shown some discomfort during the 1931–32 Australian season against pace bowling.

Following Jardine's appointment, a meeting was arranged with Nottinghamshire captain Arthur Carr and his two fast bowlers Larwood and Voce at London's Piccadilly Hotel. Jardine explained his belief that Bradman was weak against bowling directed at leg stump and that if this line of attack could be maintained, it would restrict Bradman's scoring to one side of the field, giving the bowlers greater control of his scoring. Jardine asked Larwood and Voce if they could bowl accurately on leg stump and make the ball rise up into the body of the batsman. The bowlers agreed that they could, and that it might prove effective, but Jardine stressed that bowling accurately was vitally important, or Bradman would dominate the bowling. Larwood believed that Jardine saw Bradman as his main target and wished to attack him psychologically as well as in a cricketing sense. At the same time, other Australian batsmen were also discussed. Larwood and Voce practised the plan over the remainder of the 1932 season with mixed success. Jardine also visited Frank Foster who had toured Australia in 1911–12 to discuss field placings appropriate to Australian conditions. Foster had bowled leg theory on that tour with his fielders placed close in on the leg-side, as had George Hirst in 1903–04. During the second half of the season, the team to tour Australia was announced. The selection of four fast bowlers and a few medium pacers was very unusual at the time, and it was commented on by the hosts' media, including Bradman. The selection of Eddie Paynter, who did not have a strong record, to replace the ill Kumar Shri Duleepsinhji was very likely a choice of Jardine. He had a history of good performances against Yorkshire, and Jardine considered that a player's record against northern counties was a good indication of his potential at international level.

== Bodyline tour ==
=== Beginning of the tour ===
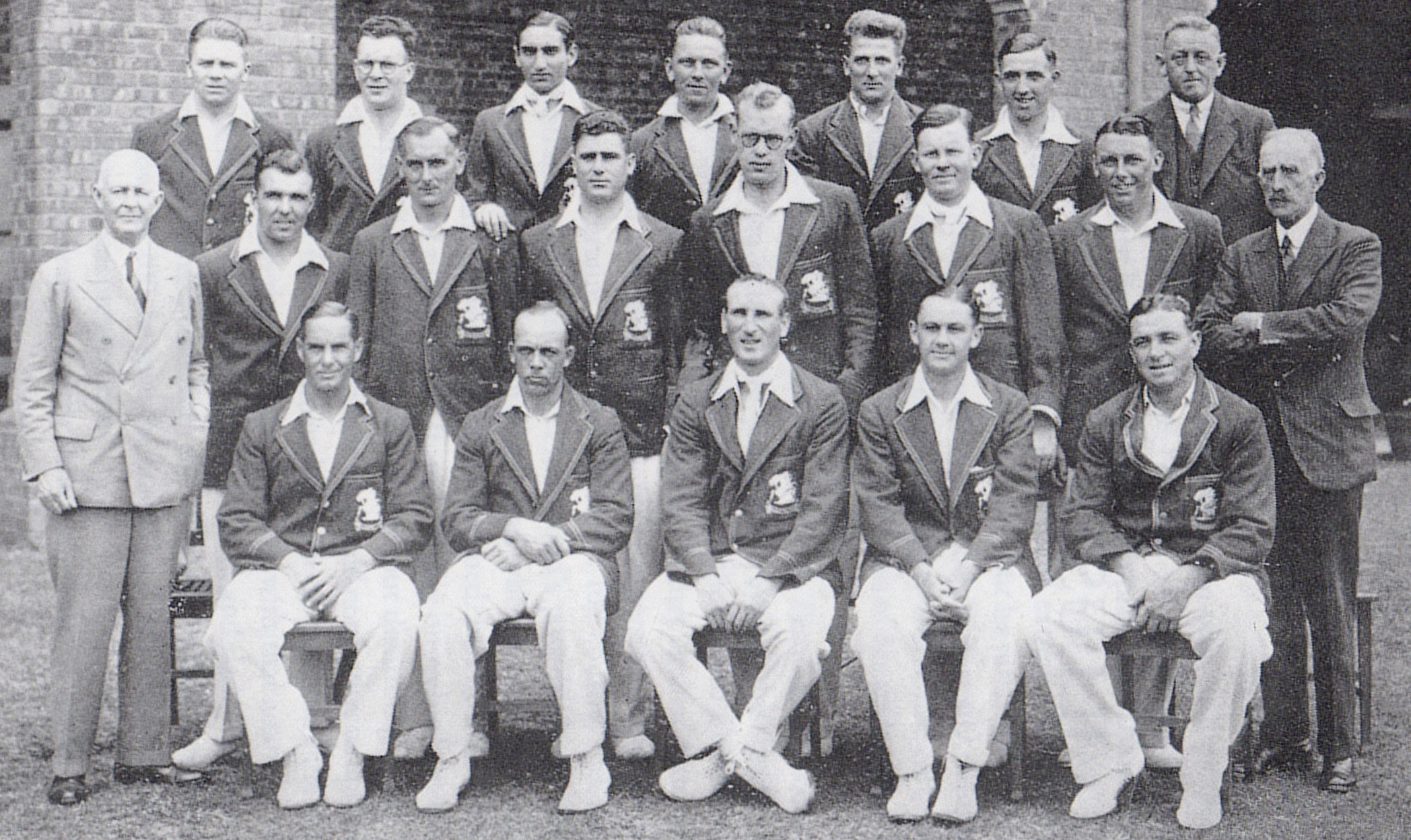
A team photograph of England's 1932–33 side: Jardine is seated at the centre of the front row; Pelham Warner is standing at the extreme left.

In Jardine's obituary, Wisden described this tour as "probably the most controversial tour in history. England won four of the five Tests, but it was the methods they employed rather than the results which caused so much discussion and acrimony." On the journey to Australia, by the boat Orontes, Jardine kept away from his team. He issued some instructions on their conduct, such as giving autographs or keeping out of the sun. He also began to have disagreements with Plum Warner, who was one of the two team managers along with Richard Palairet. He discussed tactics with Harold Larwood and other bowlers, spoke to Hedley Verity about his role in the team, and he may have met batsmen Wally Hammond and Herbert Sutcliffe. Some players reported that Jardine told them to hate the Australians in order to defeat them, while instructing them to refer to Bradman as "the little bastard." At this stage, he seems to have settled on leg theory, if not full Bodyline, as his main tactic.

Once the team arrived in Australia, Jardine quickly alienated the press by refusing to give team details before a match and being uncooperative when interviewed by journalists. The press printed some negative stories as a result and the crowds barracked as they had done on his previous tour, which made him angry. Jardine still wore his Harlequin cap and began the tour well with 98 and 127 before the first Test. Once again, he clashed with paceman Bill Bowes, refusing to give his bowler the requested field placings in an early match. As a result, Bowes deliberately gave away easy runs in an attempt to get his way, but following a discussion, Bowes was converted to Jardine's tactics and ultimately to his ability as a captain. In a tour match, Jardine also instructed Hammond to attack the bowling of Chuck Fleetwood-Smith, whom he considered dangerous and thus did not want him to play in the Tests. Up until this point, there had been little unusual about the English bowling except the number of fast bowlers. Larwood and Voce were given a light workload in the early matches by Jardine. This changed in the match against an Australian XI, from which Jardine rested himself, where the bowlers first used the tactics that came to be known as Bodyline. Under the captaincy of Wyatt, the bowlers bowled short and around leg stump, with fielders positioned close by on the leg side to catch any deflections. Wyatt later claimed that this was not planned beforehand and he simply passed on to Jardine what happened after the match. These tactics continued in the next match; several players were hit. Many commentators criticised this style of bowling; although bowlers had previously used leg theory bowling, where bowlers bowled outside leg stump with a concentration of fielders on the leg side; using these tactics with fast bowlers dropping the ball short was almost unprecedented. It was seen as dangerous and against the spirit of the game. In a letter, Jardine told Fender that his information about the Australian batting technique was correct and that it meant he was having to move more and more fielders onto the leg side. He said that "if this goes on I shall have to move the whole bloody lot to the leg side." Jardine increasingly came into disagreement with Warner over Bodyline as the tour progressed, but his tactics were successful in one respect: in six innings against the tourists ahead of the Tests, Bradman had scored only 103 runs, causing concern among the Australian public who expected much more from him.

=== Test matches ===
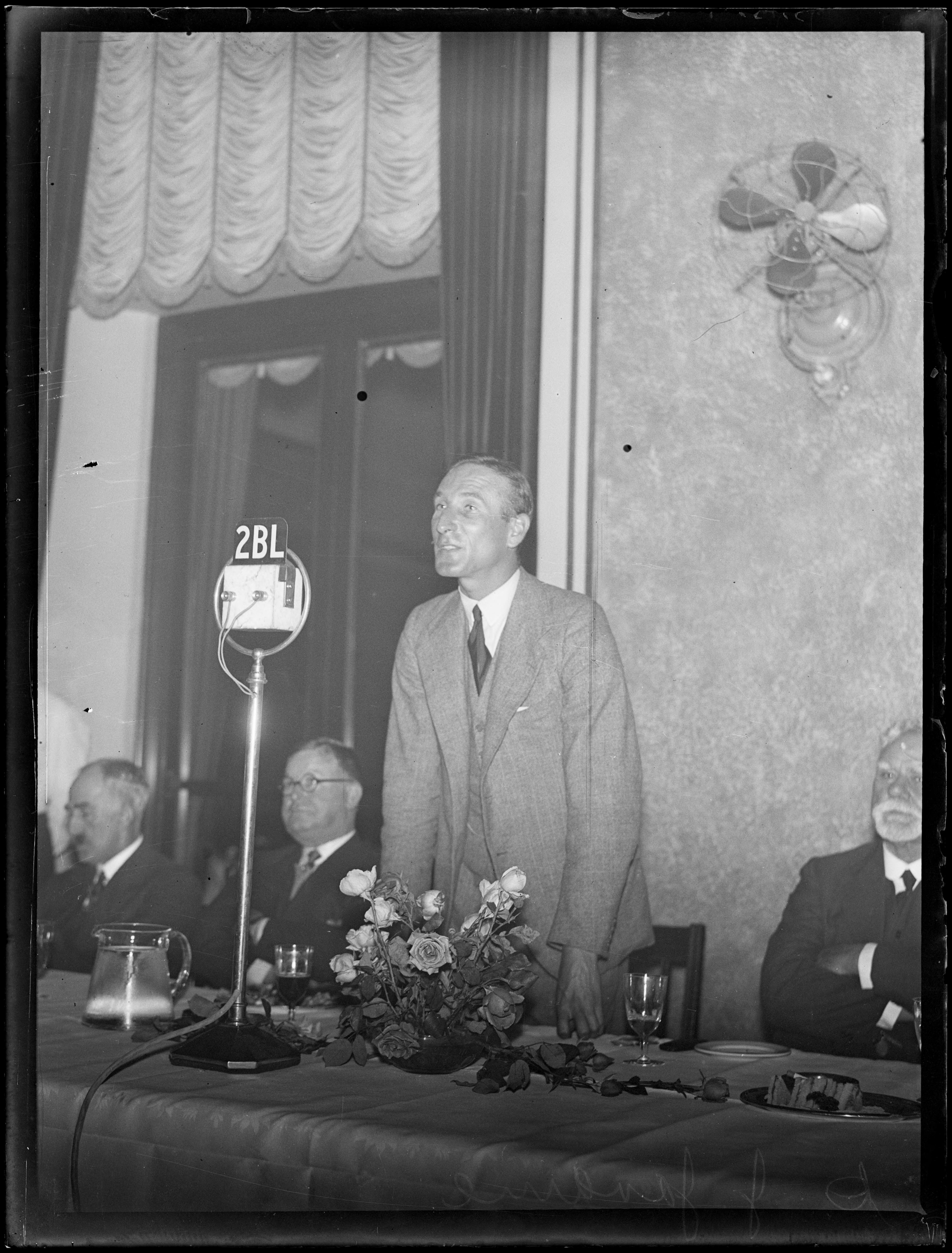
Jardine addressing an audience at the Hotel Australia on 2BL shortly after his team's arrival in Sydney in November 1932

When the first Test began, Jardine persisted with Bodyline tactics, even though Bradman, the main target, did not play in the match. David Frith has pointed out that Bradman would have been watching and seeing the tactics that England were using. However, when Stan McCabe was scoring 187 not out, Jardine was briefly seen to be unsettled as runs came quickly, and he may not have been fully convinced that the tactics would be successful. England eventually won the match comfortably. In the second Test, Jardine completely misjudged the pitch and left out a specialist spinner when conditions later in the match favoured one. The match seemed to be going well when Bill Bowes unexpectedly bowled the returning Bradman first ball in the first innings; Jardine was seen to be so delighted that he had clasped his hands above his head and performed a "war dance". This was an extremely unusual reaction in the 1930s, particularly from Jardine who rarely showed any emotion while playing cricket. In the second innings, Bradman scored an unbeaten century which helped Australia to win the match and level the series at one match each. This made it seem to critics that Bodyline was not quite the threat that had been perceived and Bradman's reputation, which had suffered slightly with his earlier failures, was restored. On the other hand, the pitch was slightly slower than was customary throughout the series, and Larwood was suffering from problems with his boots which reduced his effectiveness.

Jardine had clashed with more of his team by this stage: he had argued with Gubby Allen at least twice about his refusal to bowl Bodyline (although he did bowl bouncers and fielded in the "leg trap", the fielders who waited for catches close in on the leg side); and the Nawab of Pataudi had refused to field in the "leg trap", to which Jardine responded, "I see his highness is a conscientious objector", and subsequently allowed Pataudi to play little part in the tour.

The teams went into the third Test with the series level; England won that match but the controversy nearly ended the tour. Jardine, concerned by his poor run of batting form, had promoted himself to open the batting but was part of a drastic England collapse to 30 for four in the first innings. However, the trouble began when Bill Woodfull was struck on the chest by a Larwood delivery, drawing the comment from Jardine of "Well bowled, Harold", aimed mainly at Bradman who was also batting at the time. For the next ball faced by Woodfull, at the start of Larwood's next over, the fielders moved into the Bodyline fielding positions for the next ball he faced. Jardine wrote that Larwood had asked for the field to be moved, while Larwood said that it was Jardine's decision. The crowd became noisily angry as the ill feeling caused by the English bowling tactics spilled out, and Jardine later expressed regret that he had moved the fielders when he did. There was further anger later in the innings when Bert Oldfield suffered a fractured skull. At this point, several of the players feared that there might be a riot and that the crowd would jump onto the field to attack them; mounted police were deployed as a precaution, but the spectators remained behind the fences. Jardine then batted very slowly in an innings of 56, during which he was continuously barracked by the crowd. During the match one of the Australian team called Jardine a "bastard". He went to the Australian dressing room during the Test to demand an apology. The Australian vice-captain Vic Richardson who answered the door turned to his team and asked "OK, which of you bastards called this bastard a bastard?". Despite England's win, Wisden believed that it was probably the most unpleasant match ever played. However, it commended Jardine's courage, claimed that praise of his leadership was unanimous, and said that "above all he captained his team in this particular match like a genius". In the immediate aftermath, journalists in England and Australia took up viewpoints both for and against Jardine. The M.C.C. sent a telegram congratulating him on winning the match.

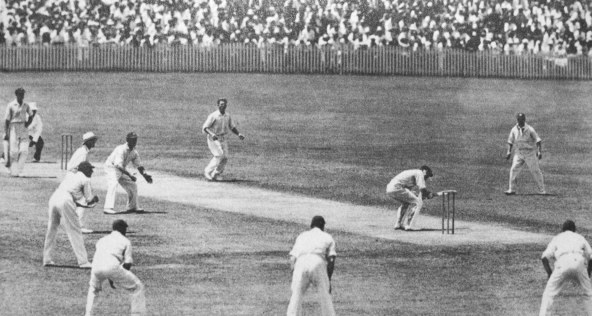
Australian captain Bill Woodfull facing bodyline bowling from Harold Larwood in the fourth Test at Brisbane 1932–33. Jardine is the third fielder anti-clockwise in the ring, the furthest fielder on the left.

Following the third Test, strongly worded cables passed between the Australian Board of Control and the M.C.C. at Lord's. The Australian Board accused the English team of unsportsmanlike tactics, stating that "Bodyline bowling has assumed such proportions as to menace the best interests of the game, making protection of the body the main consideration." The M.C.C. responded angrily to the accusations of unsporting conduct, played down the Australian claims about the danger of Bodyline and threatened to call off the tour. The series was becoming a major diplomatic incident by this stage, and many people saw Bodyline as damaging to an international relationship that needed to remain strong. Public reaction in both England and Australia was outrage directed at the other nation. The Governor of South Australia, Alexander Hore-Ruthven, who was in England at the time, expressed his concern to British Secretary of State for Dominion Affairs James Henry Thomas that this would cause a significant impact on trade between the nations. The standoff was settled only when Australian Prime Minister Joseph Lyons met members of the Australian Board and outlined to them the severe economic hardships that could be caused in Australia if the British public boycotted Australian trade. Given this understanding, the Board withdrew the allegation of unsportsmanlike behaviour two days before the fourth Test, thus saving the tour. However, correspondence continued for almost a year. Jardine was shaken by the events and by the hostile reactions that his team were receiving. Stories appeared in the press, possibly leaked by the disenchanted Nawab of Pataudi, about fights and arguments between the England players. Jardine offered to stop using Bodyline if the team did not support him, but after a private meeting (not attended by Jardine or either of the team managers) the players released a statement fully supporting Jardine and the Bodyline tactics. It was subsequently revealed that several of the players had private reservations, but they did not express them publicly at the time. Even so, Jardine would not have played in the fourth Test without the withdrawal of the unsportsmanlike accusation.

Once the fourth Test got underway, England won the match to take the series. Partly prompted by Jardine, Eddie Paynter scored 83 having released himself from hospital. Jardine went on to make a painstaking 24, at one point facing 82 balls without scoring a single run. He was not proud of his batting performance, being shamefaced to Australian Test opener Jack Fingleton, and describing his batting to Bill O'Reilly as being "like an old maid defending her virginity." England also won the final Test ending on 28 February, with a final clash taking place between Jardine and Larwood. After a long bowling spell, Larwood was furious when Jardine sent him in to bat as nightwatchman but went on to score 98 runs. Later, Larwood broke his foot while bowling in the second innings, but Jardine was not convinced that he was seriously injured. He made him stay on the field until Bradman was out. Larwood, partly through this injury and partly through political repercussions from this series, never played another Test. Also in this match, Jardine enraged Harry Alexander by asking him not to run on the pitch as he was damaging it and giving his side an advantage. He proceeded to bowl hostile bouncers at Jardine, who was struck painfully to the delight of the crowd.

While Jardine won the series as captain, he contributed just 199 runs at an average of 22.11 in the Tests, and 628 runs (average 36.94) in all first-class cricket in Australia. Jardine only played in the first Test of the short series that followed in New Zealand, due to rheumatism. All the players enjoyed the short tour although rain ruined the cricket, and Jardine was observed to show signs of paranoia towards all things Australian. Pelham Warner, although he later stated that he disapproved of Bodyline bowling, praised Jardine's captaincy on the tour and believed that he was cruelly treated by the Australian crowds. He further believed that Jardine was convinced that the tactics were legitimate.

=== Aftermath and 1933 season ===
Controversy over Bodyline continued throughout the following summer. Jardine himself contributed his opinion in a book, In Quest for the Ashes, a first-hand account of the Bodyline tour. He defended his tactics and heavily criticised the Australian barrackers, to the extent of suggesting that fixtures between England and Australia should be halted until this problem was solved. While arguments continued to rage in print and discussion, even at government level, Jardine received a hero's welcome on his return to England, making several public appearances. Despite his fears that the M.C.C. might sack him in the face of criticism, he was appointed as England captain for the series against the West Indies in 1933. He continued to captain Surrey during his infrequent first-class appearances that summer, although business commitments prevented him from playing a full season. He was cheered by the crowd or given a standing ovation when he came out to bat as M.C.C. captain against the West Indians in May, at Sheffield for Surrey against Yorkshire, and in the first and second Test matches. In all first-class cricket that season, Jardine scored 779 runs at an average of 51.93, including three hundreds. One of these centuries came in the second Test (Jardine missed the third with an injury that ended his season).

Some bowlers had experimented with Bodyline in the season, and the West Indian team, 1–0 down in the series and frustrated by the lack of pace in the pitches, decided to experiment with the tactic. Facing a good West Indies total, England suffered a batting collapse, at one point falling to 134 for four. With Les Ames in difficulty against the short-pitched bowling, Jardine said, "You get yourself down this end, Les. I'll take care of this bloody nonsense." He went right back to the bouncers, standing on tiptoe, and stopped them with a dead bat, sometimes playing the ball one handed for more control. Wisden described how he never flinched despite facing the greatest amount of Bodyline. It also believed that he played it "probably better than any other man in the world was capable of doing." He batted for nearly five hours, scoring 127, his only Test century. England then retaliated by bowling Bodyline in the West Indies' second innings, but the slow pitch meant that the match was drawn. However, this performance played a large part in turning English opinion against Bodyline. The Times used the word "Bodyline", without using inverted commas or using the qualification "so-called", for the first time. Wisden said that "most of those watching it for the first time must have come to the conclusion that, while strictly within the law, it was not nice."

=== Retirement ===
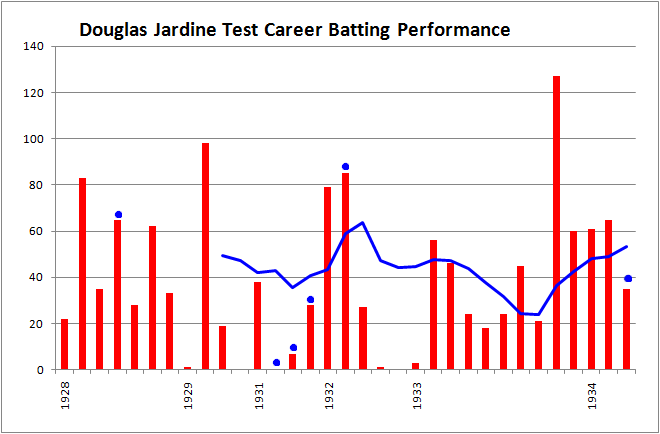
Jardine's Test career batting graph. The red bars indicate the runs that he scored in an innings, and the blue line indicates the batting average in his last 10 innings. The blue dots indicate innings in which Jardine finished not out.

During the 1933 season, Jardine was appointed as captain for the M.C.C. tour of India that winter which would feature the hosts' first Tests at home. This continued support for Jardine in the face of growing unhappiness towards Bodyline bowling came with some reservations, as the President and Secretary of the M.C.C. met Jardine for discussions prior to his appointment. This was probably about the need for diplomacy and tact on what may have proved to be a sensitive tour. With only two players from the Bodyline tour, Jardine and Verity, taking part, it was not a full-strength side but won the Test series 2–0. India were weaker than expected, and lacked a large group of quality players. Jardine nevertheless won praise from Wisden for his captaincy and his batting. He approached the matches with a very competitive spirit, seeking to gain every advantage with his tactics and research. At the same time, he was far more willing to take up speaking engagements than on the Bodyline tour, showed an appreciation and regard for Indian crowds which he had never extended to Australia, and played the diplomatic role that was usually expected of a captain of the M.C.C. at the time. He often spoke of his affection for India, describing it as the land of his birth and seemed to be relaxed and happy on this tour.

England won the Test series 2–0. Jardine contributed three fifties in four innings in the series, scoring 221 runs at an average of 73.66. He scored 60, 61 and 65 before his final Test innings ended at 35 not out. Jardine scored 831 first-class runs on the Indian leg of the tour—he played one match in Ceylon (now Sri Lanka)—averaging 55.40. Although Jardine enjoyed the tour, there were still clashes evident. There was an argument with the Viceroy over Jardine selecting the Maharaja of Patiala to play for the M.C.C. in one match; in a subsequent match, Jardine complained that the pitch was rolled for too long. He also clashed, later on, with the umpire Frank Tarrant, initially due to suspicion over the number of lbw decisions given against the M.C.C., but also because Tarrant had warned him against using Bodyline and was employed by Indian princes. Jardine threatened to stop him umpiring and sent a telegram to Lord's, with the result that Tarrant, having officiated the first two Tests, was not used in the third. For much of the time, Jardine used different tactics to those employed in Australia. Slow bowling, particularly that of Hedley Verity, played a key part in the bowling attack. At times, the faster bowlers Nobby Clark and Stan Nichols bowled Bodyline, resulting in several injuries. In this case, the Indian bowlers Mohammad Nissar and Amar Singh retaliated with Bodyline bowling of their own.

As the tour went on, there was discussion at a high level over Jardine's future. The M.C.C. authorities had realised that Bodyline was dangerous and should not be continued, but some figures such as Lord Hawke did not want to let Jardine down. Australians saw him as more of a problem; the likes of Alexander Hore-Ruthven wanted guarantees that Jardine would not use Bodyline and even that he not play. Plum Warner also believed that Jardine should no longer captain. Jardine himself saved the English selectors from any possible dilemma. In March 1934, he first told Surrey that he would be unable to play regularly any more and he resigned as captain. Then in an announcement in the Evening Standard, he stated that "I have neither the intention nor the desire to play cricket against Australia this summer." It is unclear whether this was due to the pressure over Bodyline, over assurances that the M.C.C. may have asked him to give or simply due to financial worries. This decision effectively ended his first-class career. He never played another Test and played only two more first-class matches in England, in 1937 and 1948, and one in India in 1943–44.

Jardine played in 22 Test matches for England, scoring 1,296 runs at an average of 48.00. In his first-class cricket career, he played 262 matches, scoring 14,848 runs at an average of 46.83. His occasional bowling brought him 48 wickets at an average of 31.10.

== Style and personality ==
=== Batting ===
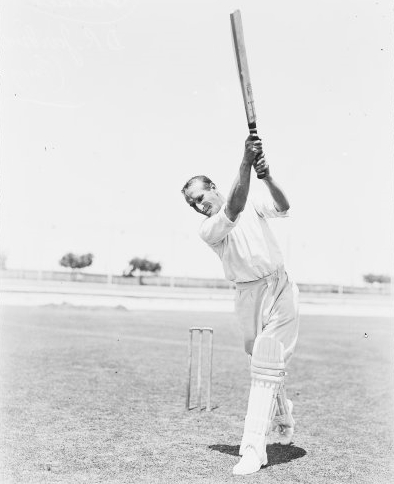
Jardine batting in the early 1930s

Jardine was seen as having a classical technique. While batting, he stood very straight and side on to the bowler. His off-driving was powerful, his defence was excellent, and he was superb at judging the line of the ball and letting it pass by if it was going to miss his wickets. His on-side play was also excellent, being able to place the ball between fielders for easy runs. Christopher Douglas described Jardine as "the epitome of the old-fashioned amateur". However, he also comments that his approach to batting was like that of a professional and that his back-foot batting was of a quality that few amateurs could manage. In 1928, Wisden's correspondent described Jardine as the most secure amateur batsman of the time, and identified his greatest strength as his defence and his "mental gifts." He played very straight and hit the ball hard in defence, but could not play all the strokes, particularly on the off side. R. C. Robertson-Glasgow believed that Jardine had modelled himself on C. B. Fry. He also noted that Jardine displayed good concentration, a strong desire to improve his batting and a fighting spirit that brought out his best in a crisis. He also said that Jardine could play every recognised cricket shot, but would not do so in a match and Robertson-Glasgow believed it was Jardine's one weakness as a batsman. The more important the occasion, the more defensive and restricted Jardine's batting became: "In general, as the task grew greater, the strokes grew fewer."

Christopher Douglas argues that Jardine liked to make his runs when his side was in difficulty and enjoyed being tested; his approach would often lead his team to recovery from an unfavourable situation. Douglas comments that Jardine held his place in the England side despite strong competition from other batsmen. His defensive technique rescued England from weak positions in around a dozen innings and only played in two losses with England (which were his two least successful games with the bat). He also excelled in the main Gentlemen v Players fixture at Lord's, making a good score in each of his appearances in this match. Jack Hobbs classed him as a great batsman and believed that he was under-rated by his contemporaries.

Wisden believed that Jardine's effective batting technique meant that fast bowlers troubled him less than other batsmen. He did have difficulties with a few bowlers. Alec Kennedy, a medium paced inswing bowler, took Jardine's wicket eleven times, eight of these occasions before the batsman had scored 20 runs. Kennedy found that Jardine had slightly slow footwork, often bowling him or trapping him lbw. Bert Ironmonger also troubled Jardine, taking his wicket in five of the eleven Test innings in which they faced each other. Jardine displayed a slight weakness against Australian slow bowlers, not moving his feet well enough against them. In 16 Test innings in Australia, he was out to slow bowlers ten times, but he rarely experienced similar difficulties against English spinners. One other bowler to cause Jardine problems was the Australian paceman Tim Wall, who took his wicket five times on the nine occasions he bowled to him.

=== Captaincy ===
As a captain, Jardine inspired great loyalty in his players, even if they did not approve of his tactics. Christopher Douglas judges that Jardine did very well to keep the team united and loyal on the Bodyline tour. He points out that team spirit was always excellent and the players showed great determination and resolve. Jardine particularly impressed Yorkshiremen who played under him, as they believed he thought about cricket in a similar way to their county colleagues. He became close to Herbert Sutcliffe during the Bodyline tour, even though Sutcliffe was sceptical about Jardine on the previous Australian tour in 1928–29. Hedley Verity was impressed by Jardine's tactical understanding and named his younger son Douglas after the captain. Bill Bowes expressed approval of his leadership after initial misgivings, and went on to call him England's greatest captain. Nevertheless, some players such as Arthur Mitchell who played under Jardine believed he was intolerant and unsupportive of players of lesser talent, expecting everyone to perform at world-class standards.

Jardine insisted on strict discipline from his players but in return he went to great lengths to look after them, such as organising dental treatment or providing champagne for his tired bowlers. Critics praised his skill in field placing, which was sometimes interpreted as panic when he made frequent changes if the batsmen were on top. He also displayed great physical courage, such as when he was struck by a ball hard enough to draw blood on the Bodyline tour, but refused to show pain before reaching the dressing room. On the same tour, he instructed his men not to be friendly or to socialise with the Australian players; Gubby Allen even claimed that Jardine instructed the team to hate the Australians. Robertson-Glasgow wrote that Jardine made thorough preparation for games in which he was captain, studying individual batsmen at great length to find weaknesses. He had very clear plans, judged the strengths and weaknesses of his teams and knew how to get the best out of individual players. However, Robertson-Glasgow considered it a grave misjudgement to make Jardine captain of England, particularly given his known antipathy towards Australia. Pelham Warner described how Jardine "was a master of tactics and strategy, and was especially adept in managing fast bowlers and thereby preserving their energy. He possessed a great capacity for taking pains, which, it has been said, is the mark of a genius ... As a field tactician and selector of teams he was, I consider, surpassed by no one and equalled by few, if any."

Laurence Le Quesne argues that one of Jardine's greatest talents, and at the same time greatest weaknesses, was his ability to formulate a winning strategy without consideration of wider contexts such as the social aspect of the game. On the Bodyline tour, he ignored the diplomacy required of an M.C.C. delegation. Instead, he embarked, according to Le Quesne, to win the Tests and settle personal scores with the Australians. Jardine was personally incapable of reacting to the crowds or responding to the controversy in a way that would have eased tensions, and so was not a good choice as captain given what the selectors already knew of him. Nevertheless, Le Quesne believed that when trouble arose, Jardine conducted himself with "great moral courage and an impressive degree of dignity and restraint."

In his Wisden obituary, Jardine was described as one of England's best captains, while Jack Hobbs rated him the second best captain after Percy Fender. Warner also said that he was a fine captain on and off the field, and in dealing with administrators. In fact, he stated that, "If ever there was a cricket match between England and the rest of the world and the fate of England depended upon its result, I would pick Jardine as England captain every time."

=== Personality ===
Jardine divided opinion among those with whom he played. He could be charming and witty or ruthless and harsh, while many people who knew him believed him to be innately shy. David Frith describes him as a complex figure who could change moods quickly. Although he could be friendly off the field, he became hostile and determined once he stepped onto the field. At his memorial service, he was described by Hubert Ashton as being "provocative, austere, brusque, shy, humble, thoughtful, kindly, proud, sensitive, single-minded and possessed of immense moral and physical courage," and Frith argues that these varied qualities are easily proven by what was said about him.

Harold Larwood maintained great respect for Jardine, treasuring a gift his captain gave him after the Bodyline tour and believing him to be a great man. Jardine showed affection for Larwood in return even after both of their retirements; he expressed his concern for the way Larwood was treated, hosted a lunch for the former fast bowler shortly before he emigrated to Australia and met him there in 1954. On the other hand, Donald Bradman would never speak to journalists about Bodyline or Jardine, and refused to give a tribute when Jardine died in 1958. Jack Fingleton admitted that he had liked Jardine and stated that he and Larwood had each done their job on the Bodyline tour, and expressed regret at the way both left cricket in acrimonious circumstances. Fingleton also described Jardine as an aloof individual who preferred to take his time in judging a person before befriending them, a quality that caused problems in Australia. Bill O'Reilly stated that he disliked Jardine at the time of Bodyline, but on meeting him later found him agreeable and even charming.

Alan Gibson said that Jardine had "irony rather than humour". He sent Herbert Sutcliffe an umbrella as a joke on the day of his benefit match, when rain would have ruined the match and lost Sutcliffe a considerable amount of money. Many people who knew Jardine later in his life described him as having a sense of humour. Robertson-Glasgow noted that while he could curse very eloquently, Jardine displayed "dislike of waste in material or words." He also commented that "if he has sometimes been a fierce enemy, he has also been a wonderful friend."

== Later life ==
=== Career after cricket ===
Shortly before the tour of India in 1933–34, Jardine became engaged and on 14 September 1934, married Irene "Isla" Margaret Peat in London. She had met Jardine at shooting parties at her father's Norfolk home. According to Gerald Howat, Jardine's marriage was the probable reason for his giving up playing first-class cricket. Jardine's father-in-law was keen for him to pursue his law career but he instead continued as a bank clerk and began to work as a journalist. He reported on the 1934 Ashes for the Evening Standard. His writing for the press, and in a follow-up book on the series, was critical of selectors but less so of the players. In 1936, he penned Cricket: how to succeed, which was written as an instruction book for the National Union of Teachers. There was a possibility of his going to Australia as a journalist to cover the M.C.C. tour of 1936–37, to the dismay of Hore-Ruthven, but nothing came of this. With alterations to the law in 1935, changing the lbw law and preventing Bodyline bowling, Jardine became increasingly disillusioned with top-level cricket. He had grown uncomfortable with the nationalism stirred up by Tests, the greed of clubs and the large public following of individual players, particularly Bradman. At the same time, Jardine seemed to be ostracised by cricket writers and commentators, who simply ignored him. For example, Wisden made no mention of his retirement. Christopher Douglas believes that Jardine was used as a scapegoat for Bodyline once the M.C.C. stopped supporting the tactic and that a stigma was attached to him for the rest of his life and beyond.

Although Jardine had retired from regular first-class competition, he continued to play club cricket. Jardine and his wife initially lived in Kensington but moved to Reading after the birth of their first child, daughter Fianach. A second daughter, Marion, followed but the family suffered from financial worries. Jardine, as well as working in journalism, earned money from playing bridge. The family also tried unsuccessfully to engage in market gardening. To make more money, Jardine became a salesman with Cable & Wireless before working for a coal mining company in the late 1930s. In 1939, he returned to cricket journalism and according to Christopher Douglas, achieved his highest standard as a writer.

=== Career in the Second World War ===
Jardine joined the Territorial Army in August 1939. Once World War II began, he was commissioned into the Royal Berkshire Regiment and went with the British Expeditionary Force to France. He served at Dunkirk, where he was fortunate to escape but suffered some injuries. After serving as staff captain at St. Albans, he was posted to India for the remainder of the war. He served in Quetta, then Simla as a major in the Central Provisions Directorate. He became fluent in the Hindustani language and although friendly, never formed close relationships with other officers. He gave lectures and played some cricket while in India. He left the army in 1945 only to find his job with the coal mining company was no longer available.

In the meantime, his wife had moved to Somerset. In 1940, she gave birth to a son, Euan, who had many medical problems, and in 1943 she bore a third daughter, Iona. The pressure of running the household and caring for Euan led Isla to have a nervous breakdown after Iona's birth. When Jardine returned from the war, the family moved to Radlett to be closer to London. Isla recovered and Jardine found a job with paper manufacturers Wiggins Teape. In 1946, Jardine was chosen to play for Old England in a popular and successful fund raising match against Surrey. He displayed much of his old batting skill but did not show much involvement with his team-mates. By 1948, Jardine was more accepted in the cricket world. This was partly due to English perception of the short-pitched fast bowling of Australian pairing Ray Lindwall and Keith Miller as being hostile. England's poor performance in the 1946–47 and 1948 Ashes also caused writers to remember Jardine more fondly as an icon of past English success.

=== Final years ===
In 1953, Jardine resumed journalism for the Ashes series and expressed a high opinion of Len Hutton's captaincy. He also did some broadcasting and wrote short stories to supplement his income; Isla was in poor health and her medical care was expensive. In the same year, he became the first President of the Umpires Association, while from 1955 to 1957 he was President of the Oxford University Cricket Club. In 1953, he travelled, with some trepidation, as a board member of the Scottish Australian Company to inspect some land in Australia. While there, he struck up a friendship with Fingleton and was surprised to be well received in the country, in his own words, as "an old so-and-so who got away with it."

In 1957, Jardine travelled to Rhodesia, again to inspect some land, with his daughter Marion. While there, he became ill with tick fever. He showed no improvement upon his return to England and further tests revealed that he had advanced lung cancer. After some treatment, he travelled with his wife to a clinic in Switzerland but it was discovered that the cancer had spread and was incurable. He died in Switzerland on 18 June 1958 and his ashes were scattered at the summit of Cross Craigs overlooking Loch Rannoch in Perthshire, Scotland. His family had enquired about having his ashes dispersed at Lord's, but this honour was restricted to war dead. When he died, his estate was valued at just over £71,000, which would have been worth around £1,765,000 in 2022 terms.

== Legacy ==
Jardine is inextricably associated with Bodyline. John Arlott wrote in 1989 that "It is no exaggeration to say that, among Australians, Douglas Jardine is probably the most disliked of cricketers." In the view of Christopher Douglas, his name "stands for the legendary British qualities of cool-headed determination, implacable resolve, patrician disdain for crowds and critics alike – if you're English that is. To Australians the name is synonymous with the legendary British qualities of snobbishness, cynicism and downright Pommie arrogance." He also argues that Bodyline, which was legal at the time, was a necessary step to overcome the unfair advantage which batsmen of the time enjoyed.

After the Bodyline tour, according to cricket writer Gideon Haigh, Jardine was seen as "the most reviled man in sport." This perception faded from the 1950s onwards, and in more recent times, Jardine has been viewed more sympathetically. In 2002, the England captain Nasser Hussain was compared to Jardine as a compliment when he displayed ruthlessness against the opposition.

== Bibliography ==
- Bowes, Bill (1949). Express Deliveries. London: Stanley Paul.
- Douglas, Christopher (2002). Douglas Jardine: Spartan Cricketer. London: Methuen. ISBN 0-413-77216-0.
- Fingleton, Jack (1947). Cricket Crisis. London, Melbourne: Cassell.
- Frith, David (2002). Bodyline Autopsy. The full story of the most sensational Test cricket series: Australia v England 1932–33. London: Aurum Press. ISBN 1-85410-896-4.
- Gibson, Alan (1979). The Cricket Captains of England. London: Cassell. ISBN 0-304-29779-8.
- Hamilton, Duncan (2009). Harold Larwood. London: Quercus. ISBN 978-1-84916-207-4.
- Hill, Alan (2000). Hedley Verity. Portrait of a Cricketer. Edinburgh and London: Mainstream Publishing. ISBN 1-84018-302-0.
- Howat, Gerald M. D. (September 2004). "Jardine, Douglas Robert (1900–1958)". Oxford Dictionary of National Biography (online ed.). Oxford University Press. doi:10.1093/ref:odnb/34158. (Subscription, Wikipedia Library access or UK public library membership required.)
- Le Quesne, A. L. (1983). The bodyline controversy. London: Secker and Warburg. ISBN 0-436-24410-1.
- Peebles, Ian (1978). Spinner's Yarn. Newton Abbot: Readers Union Ltd.
- Robertson-Glasgow, R. C. (1943). Cricket Prints. Some Batsmen and Bowlers 1920–1940. London: T. Werner Laurie Ltd.
- Warner, Pelham (1951). Long innings: the autobiography of Sir Pelham Warner. London: Harrap.

Sporting positions
Preceded by Percy Chapman	English national cricket captain 1931–1933/4	Succeeded by Bob Wyatt
