= George Douglas Verity =

George Douglas Verity (4 June 1933 – 24 August 2012) was an English cricketer, mountain climber, hotelier, and professional golfer.

Verity was the younger son of Yorkshire and England Test cricketer Hedley Verity and his wife Kathleen Verity. He was born in Rawdon, shortly after his father returned to England from the Bodyline cricket tour to Australia in 1933. He was named after cricketers George Hirst and Douglas Jardine (his elder brother Wilfred had been named after Wilfred Rhodes). His father died in Naples in July 1943, of wounds inflicted while serving in Sicily as a captain with the 1st Battalion of the Green Howards during the Second World War, when Verity was 10 years old.

He was educated at Littlemoor Primary School in Rawdon, alongside future Yorkshire cricketers Brian Close and Bryan Stott, and at Woodhouse Grove School at Apperley Bridge, near Bradford. After leaving school, he became a groundsman and cricket professional for Yeadon in the Bradford Cricket League, but retired from cricket after suffering an injury at football trials with Leeds United FC.

He moved to Snowdonia in 1955 to manage the Pen-y-Gwryd Hotel, which had been used as a training base by the team that first climbed Mount Everest in 1953. He enjoyed mountain climbing, and was an early volunteer with the Snowdon Rescue Service. He married Ann in 1963. They had two sons.

In 1963 he became the professional golfer at St Deiniol Golf Club in Bangor, moving to Pwllheli Golf Club in 1970. He retired in May 1998, and was club captain in 1999.

His brother Wilfred became a photographer with a shop in Otley. Wilfred was killed in an unusual road accident in 1975, when he was hit by a run-away cattle trailer, whilst out walking with his son. Wilfred's son Hedley was also seriously injured, but survived.
