= R. C. Robertson-Glasgow =

Scottish cricketer and cricket writer

Personal information
- Full name: Raymond Charles Robertson-Glasgow
- Born: 15 July 1901; Murrayfield, Edinburgh, Scotland
- Died: 4 March 1965 (aged 63); Buckhold, Berkshire, England
- Nickname: Crusoe
- Batting: Right-handed
- Bowling: Right-arm fast-medium

Domestic team information
- Years: Team
- 1920–1923: Oxford University
- 1920–1935: Somerset
- 1927–1933: Marylebone Cricket Club

Career statistics
Competition	First-class
Matches	144
Runs scored	2,102
Batting average	13.22
100s/50s	0/4
Top score	80
Balls bowled	25,190
Wickets	464
Bowling average	25.77
5 wickets in innings	28
10 wickets in match	6
Best bowling	9/38
Catches/stumpings	88/–
- Source: CricketArchive, 16 December 2008

Raymond Charles "Crusoe" Robertson-Glasgow (15 July 1901 – 4 March 1965) was a Scottish cricketer and cricket writer.

== Early life ==
Robertson-Glasgow was born in Edinburgh to a Scottish soldier and the daughter of an East Anglian clergyman. Their marriage was an unhappy one, and Robertson-Glasgow's mother was inattentive to her two sons. He won a scholarship to Charterhouse School and went on to Corpus Christi College, Oxford. Although he enjoyed university life, it was while at Oxford that he began to experience the periodical depression that he was to struggle with for the rest of his life.

== Cricket ==
Robertson-Glasgow was a right-arm fast-medium bowler and useful tail-end batsman who played for Oxford University and Somerset in a first-class career that lasted from 1920 to 1937. In all he took 464 wickets at 25.77 in first-class cricket, with best innings figures of 9 for 38 when Somerset defeated Middlesex at Lord's in June 1924.

Convivial, popular and humorous, Robertson-Glasgow subsequently won acclaim for his writing, in which his strong sense of humour shone through. In 1933 he became cricket correspondent for the Morning Post. He later wrote for the Daily Telegraph, The Observer and the Sunday Times. He retired from regular cricket writing in 1953. He was Chairman of the Cricket Writers' Club in 1959.

His nickname of "Crusoe" came, according to Robertson-Glasgow himself, from the Essex batsman Charlie McGahey during a match in May 1920. When his captain asked McGahey how he had been dismissed, he replied: "I was bowled by an old ----- I thought was dead two thousand years ago, called Robinson Crusoe."

== Death ==
Robertson-Glasgow committed suicide during a snowstorm whilst in the grip of melancholic depression.

== Books ==
Robertson-Glasgow's cricket books include:

- Cricket Prints: Some Batsmen and Bowlers (1920-1940) (Werner Laurie, 1948)
- More Cricket Prints: Some Batsmen and Bowlers (1920-1945) (1948)
- 46 Not Out - an autobiography (1948)
- Rain Stopped Play (1948)
- The Brighter Side of Cricket (Arthur Barker, 1950)
- All in the Game (1952)
- How to Become a Test Cricketer (1962)
- Crusoe on Cricket: The Cricket Writings of R. C. Robertson-Glasgow (1966)

He also wrote the following non-cricket books:

- I was Himmler's Aunt (1940)
- No Other Land (1942)
- Country Talk: A Miscellany (1964)
