= List of British Army first-class cricketers =

This is a list of cricketers who played first-class matches for the British Army cricket team. The team played a total of 51 first-class matches between 1912 and 1939. It played the Royal Navy team 14 times in top-level matches, all of which were played at Lord's, (Note: After 1929 the annual match against the Navy became a two-day fixture and, as a result, was no longer rated first-class.) and the Royal Air Force five times in first-class matches, but otherwise played mainly against university teams, with Cambridge University (15 times) and Oxford University (11 times) their most frequent opponents in top-level matches. The Army also played MCC three times and against the touring New Zealanders in 1927, South Americans in 1932 and West Indians in 1933. Army cricket teams continue to play organised matches in the modern era, but none have held official status since 1939.

A combined Army and Navy team played three first-class matches between 1910 and 1919, the Combined Services team played 63 first-class matches between 1920 and 1964, and a British Indian Army team played two first-class matches, one in each of the 1926–27 and 1934–35 Indian seasons. Players who appeared in first-class matches for these teams are not included on this list unless they also played for the Army in a first-class match.

== A ==
- Gilbert Alexander
- Arthur Archdale
- Francis Arkwright
- Edward Armitage
- Frederick Arnold

== B ==
- Michael Baines
- Henry Baird
- William Barber
- Terence Battersby
- John Bean
- Thomas Bevan
- Lionel Bostock
- Francis Brooke
- Godfrey Bryan
- Eric Buller
- John Burrough
- Montagu Brocas Burrows
- Harry Bush

== C ==
- Edward Cadogan
- Noel Carbutt
- Arthur Carr
- John Carr
- James Cassels
- Edward Challenor
- Raleigh Chichester-Constable
- Basil Clarke
- Arthur Cocks
- Colin Cokayne-Frith
- Eric Cole
- John Cole
- Geoffrey Cooke
- Wykeham Cornwallis
- Alexander Cowie

== D ==
- Philip Davies
- Harold Day
- William Dickinson
- Guy Dury
- William Dutnall
- Ernest Dynes

== F ==
- Harold Fawcus
- Godfrey Firbank
- Edward Fitzherbert
- Gustavus Fowke
- Robert St Leger Fowler
- Ian Freeland

== G ==
- Hary Gardner
- Clive Garthwaite
- Kenneth Gibson
- Adrian Gore
- Michael Green
- George Grimston
- Daniel Grose
- Lancelot Grove

== H ==
- Nigel Haig
- Cyril Hamilton
- Michael Harbottle
- Basil Hayles
- Edward Henslow
- Reginald Hewetson
- Charles Higginbotham
- Denys Hill
- Arthur Hope
- Bernard Howlett
- Eric Hudson
- Reginald Hudson
- Francis Hugonin
- James Hyndson

== J ==
- Tom Jameson
- Julian Jefferson
- Peter Randall Johnson
- Alexander Johnston
- Ronald Joy

== K ==
- Henry Kirkwood
- Neville Knox

== L ==
- Anthony Lawrence
- Hervey Lawrence
- Lawrence Le Fleming
- James Leaf
- Bill Leggatt
- Harry Lewis-Barclay
- Charles Loyd

== M ==
- Barney McCall
- Charles McCarthy
- Kenelm McCloughin
- Alfred McGaw
- Kenneth Mackessack
- Michael Magill
- Dunlop Manners
- James Mardall
- Fernley Marrison
- Lionel Marson
- Robert Melsome
- Mark Milbank
- Harold Miles
- Arnold Minnis
- Howell Moore-Gwyn
- Alfred Musson
- Claude Myburgh

== N ==
- Frank Naumann
- Peter Nelson

== O ==
- Charles Orton

== P ==
- Charles Packe
- Richard Page
- Philip Pank
- Walter Parke
- William Parker
- William Payne-Gallwey
- Massey Poyntz

== R ==
- Rowan Rait Kerr
- John Rawlence
- Geoffrey Rawson
- Geoffrey Rimbault
- William Robins
- Douglas Robinson
- Percy Robinson
- Francis Rogers

== S ==
- Percival Sanger
- Harold Scott
- George Scott-Chad
- Frederick Shaw
- Frank Simpson
- Arthur Southby
- Trevor Spring
- Arthur Stanley-Clarke
- Ronald Stanyforth
- John Steele
- John Stephenson
- Charles Sutton

== T ==
- John Tasker
- Lionel Tennyson
- Edmund Thomson
- Gordon Thorne
- Claud Tudor
- Roland Tudor
- Neville Tufnell
- Arthur Turner
- Walter Turner
- Arthur Tyler

== V ==
- Henry van Straubenzee

== W ==
- John Walford
- Frank Ward
- Gilbert White
- Michael White
- Reginald White
- William White
- Robert Whittaker
- John Whitty
- Alexander Wilkinson
- Edward Williams
- Leo Williams
- Peter Williams
- Francis Wilson
- Francis Wyatt

== Y ==
- Humphrey Yates

== See also ==
- List of Combined Services (United Kingdom) cricketers
- List of Royal Air Force first-class cricketers
- List of Royal Navy first-class cricketers
