= Robert Whitaker =

Robert Whitaker or Whittaker may refer to:

- Robert Whittaker (fighter) (born 1990), Australian mixed martial artist
- Robert Whitaker (equestrian) (born 1983), British showjumper
- Robert Whitaker (author) (active since 1989), American author
- Robert Whitaker (surgeon) (active since 1973), British author, surgeon and anatomist
- Robert Whitaker (photographer) (1939–2011), British photographer
- Robert Whittaker (cricketer) (1908–1990), English cricketer
- Robert Whittaker (American football) (1904–1990), American football player and coach
- Robert Whittaker (ecologist) (1920–1980), American vegetation ecologist
- Robert Whittaker (British Army officer) (1894–1967), British Army major
- Robert Whitaker (minister) (1863–1944), Baptist minister and political activist
- Robert H. Whittaker (politician), American member of the Virginia House of Delegates

== See also ==
- Bob Whittaker (born 1939), U.S. representative from Kansas
