= Robert H. Whittaker =

Robert H. Whittaker may refer to:

- Robert Whittaker (ecologist), American plant ecologist
- Robert H. Whittaker (politician), member of the Virginia House of Delegates

== See also ==
- Robert Whittaker (disambiguation)
