= Dutnall =

Dutnall is a surname. Notable people with the surname include:

- Frank Dutnall (1895–1971), English cricketer
- William Dutnall (1888–1960), English cricketer
