= Caryl Thain =

English cricketer

Personal information
- Full name: Caryl Thain
- Born: 11 April 1895; Catherington, Hampshire, England
- Died: 24 September 1969 (aged 74); Lambeth, London, England
- Batting: Right-handed
- Bowling: Right-arm fast-medium

Domestic team information
- Years: Team
- 1923: Surrey

Career statistics
Competition	First-class
Matches	2
Runs scored	4
Batting average	4
100s/50s	–/–
Top score	4*
Balls bowled	162
Wickets	3
Bowling average	29.33
5 wickets in innings	–
10 wickets in match	–
Best bowling	3/38
Catches/stumpings	–/–
- Source: Cricinfo, 28 August 2012

Caryl Thain (11 April 1895 – 24 September 1969) was an English cricketer. Thain was a right-handed batsman who bowled right-arm fast-medium. He was born at Catherington, Hampshire.

Thain made his first-class debut for Surrey against Glamorgan in the 1923 County Championship at Cardiff Arms Park. Glamorgan batted first, making 168 all out, with Thain bowling thirteen wicketless overs during their first-innings. Responding in their first-innings, Surrey made 158 all out, with Thain being dismissed for a duck by Frank Ryan. Glamorgan were dismissed for just 35 in their second-innings, with Surrey winning the match by ten wickets. He made a second first-class appearance for the county in that same season, against Scotland at Hamilton Crescent, Glasgow. Surrey won the toss and elected to bat first, making 433 all out, with Thain ending the innings not out on 4. Scotland were then dismissed for 187 in their first-innings, with Thain taking the wickets of John Kerr, Gilbert Alexander and David Stevenson to finish the innings with figures of 3/38. In their second-innings, Surrey made 191/6 declared, with Thain not required to bat in the innings. Set a target of 438 for victory, Scotland made 137/9, with the match ending as a draw.

He later served on the Surrey committee for over forty years, as well as serving as the fifteenth President of Surrey County Cricket Club in 1969, holding the post until his death at Lambeth, London, on 24 September 1969.

Thain was 6'4" tall, handsome, charming and a very hard worker. He married Dorothy Sugden in 1924, and they had two daughters, Elizabeth Jill and Shirley Patricia (Pat), and 6 grandchildren. Pat won the junior Wimbledon doubles tournament playing with Jennifer Meade in 1948. Thain had a successful business career with HH Robertson, which became Robertson Thain in 1952. He was famous as a wonderful host and story teller.
