= Threlfall Baines =

South African cricketer

- Born: 20 June 1908; Johannesburg, South Africa
- Died: 8 May 1994 (aged 85); Western Cape, South Africa
- Occupation: First-class cricketer
- Years active: 1925–1937
- Relatives: Michael Baines (cousin)

Threlfall Werge Talbot Baines (20 June 1908 – 8 May 1994) was a South African first-class cricketer active from 1925 to 1937 who played for Cambridge University, Eastern Province and Transvaal. He was born in Johannesburg and died in Western Cape. He appeared in 20 first-class matches. His cousin, Michael Baines, was also a first-class cricketer.
