= Kasauli =

Kasauli Kussowlie
- Town
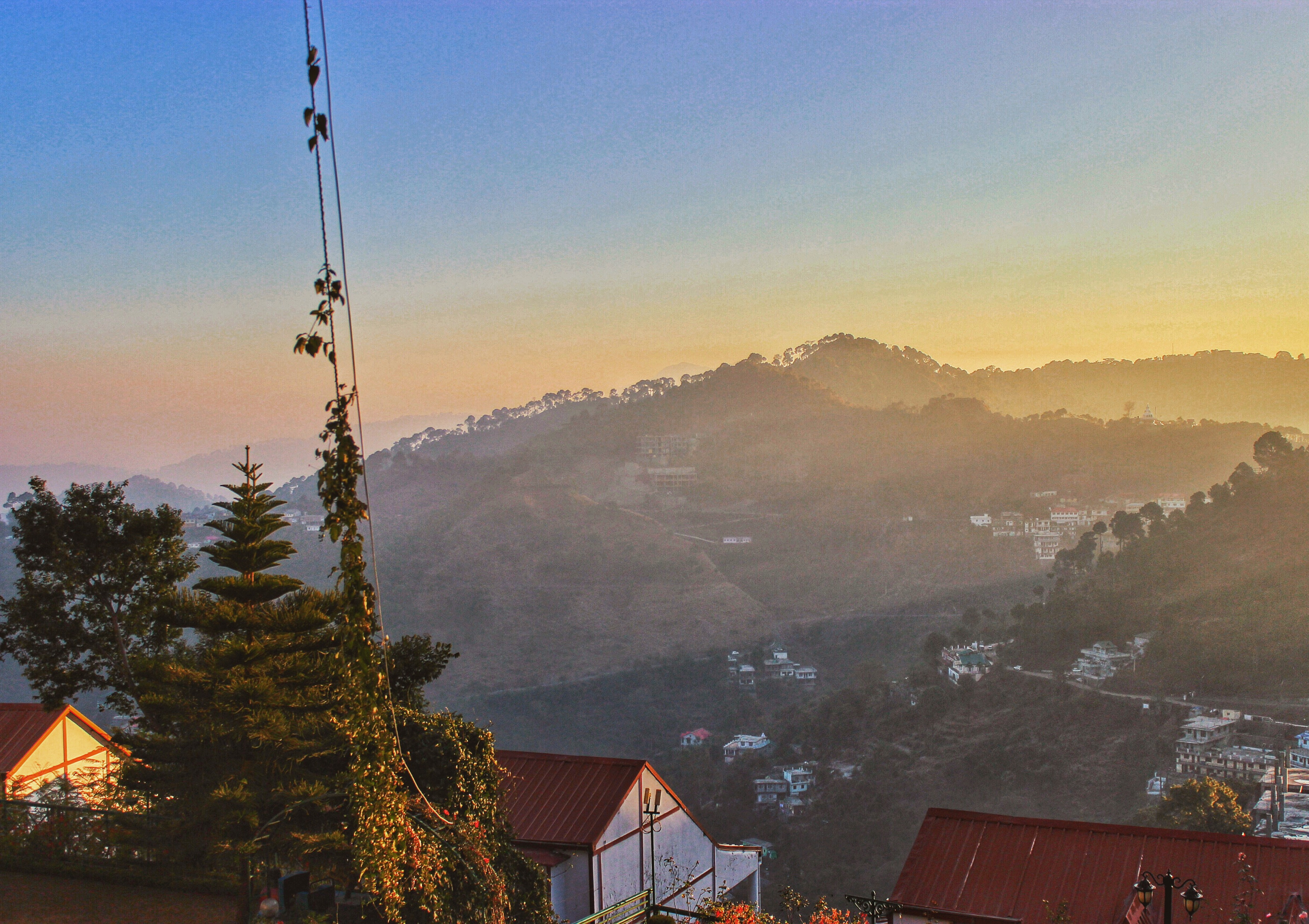
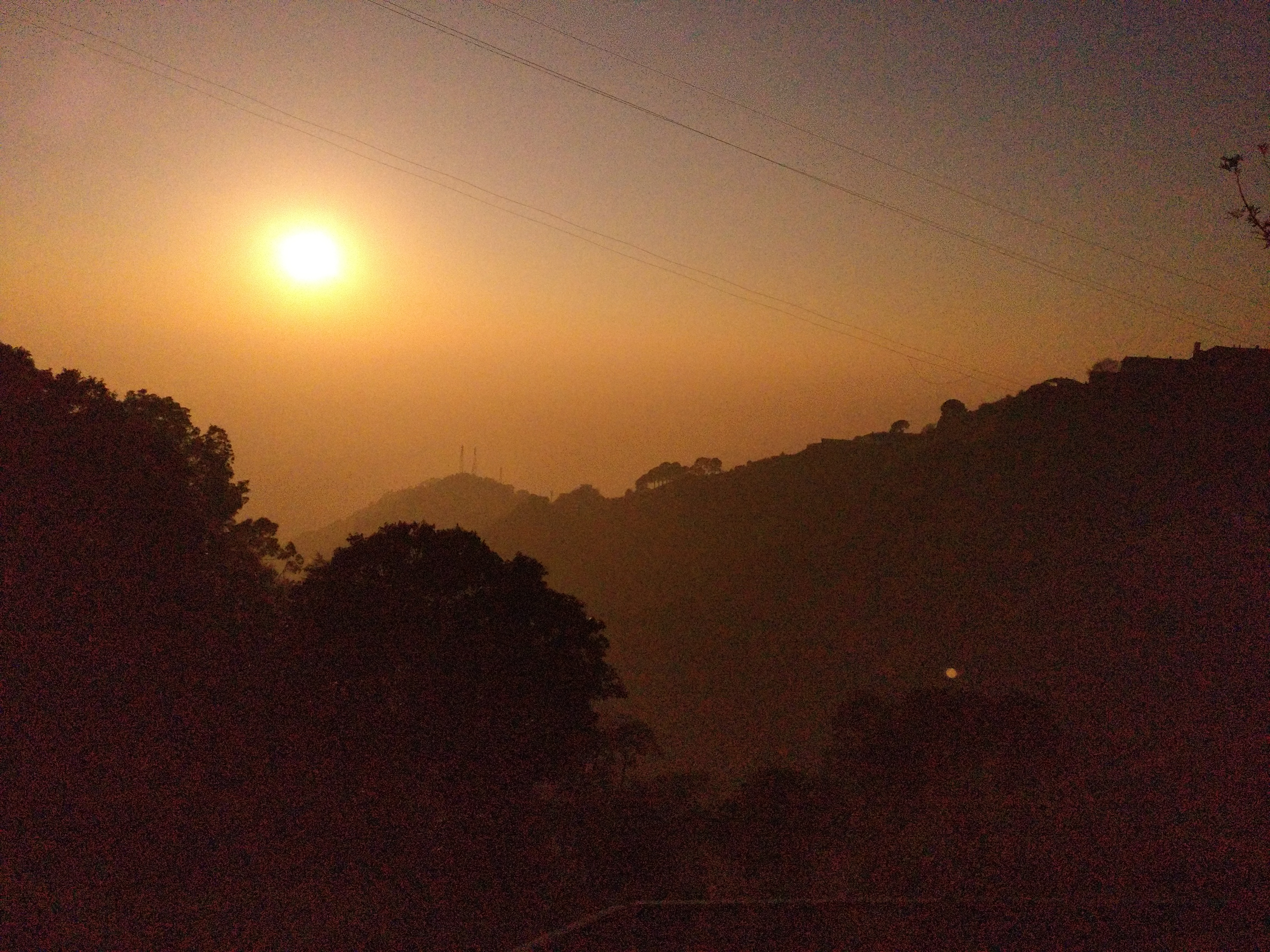
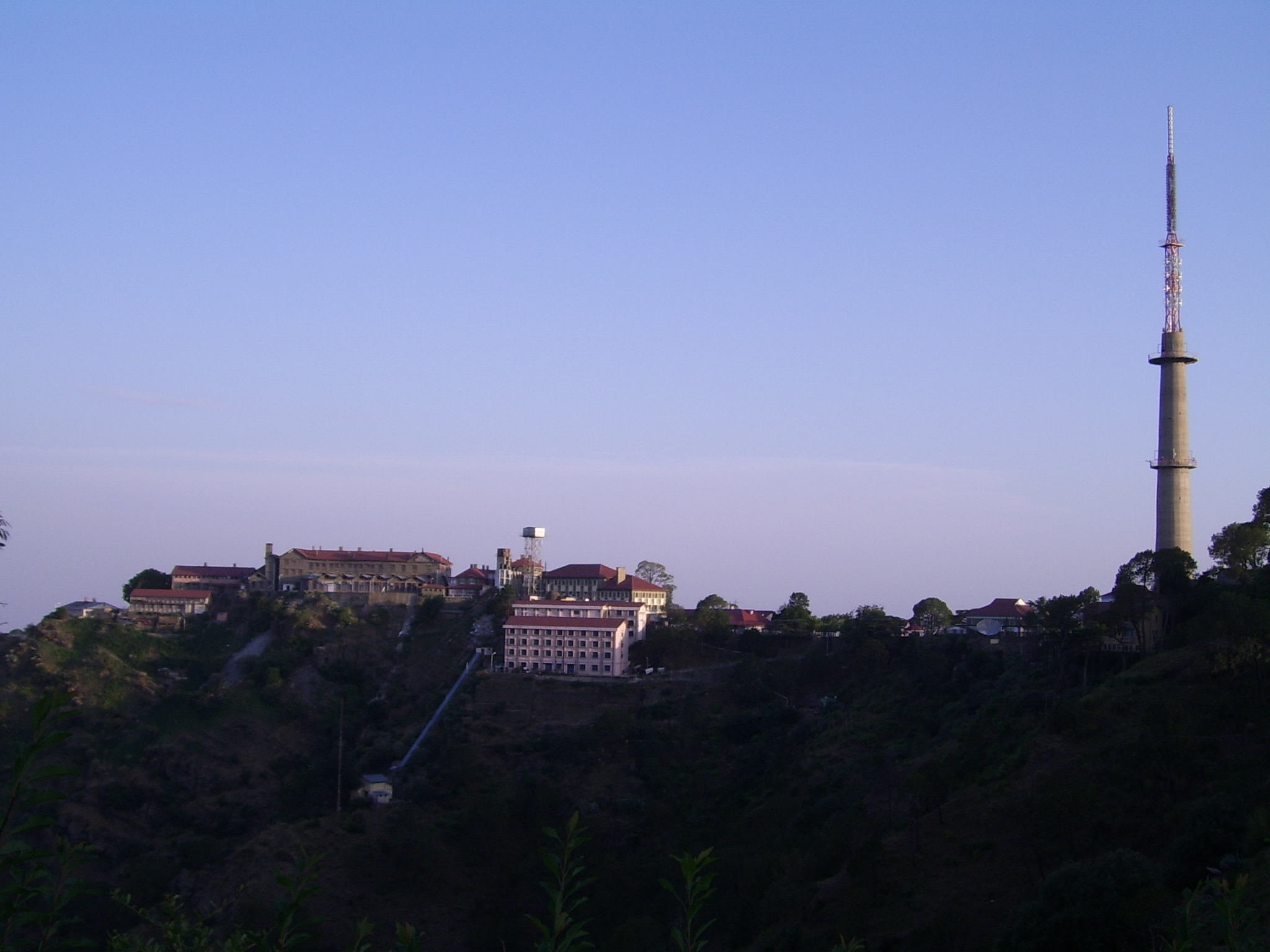
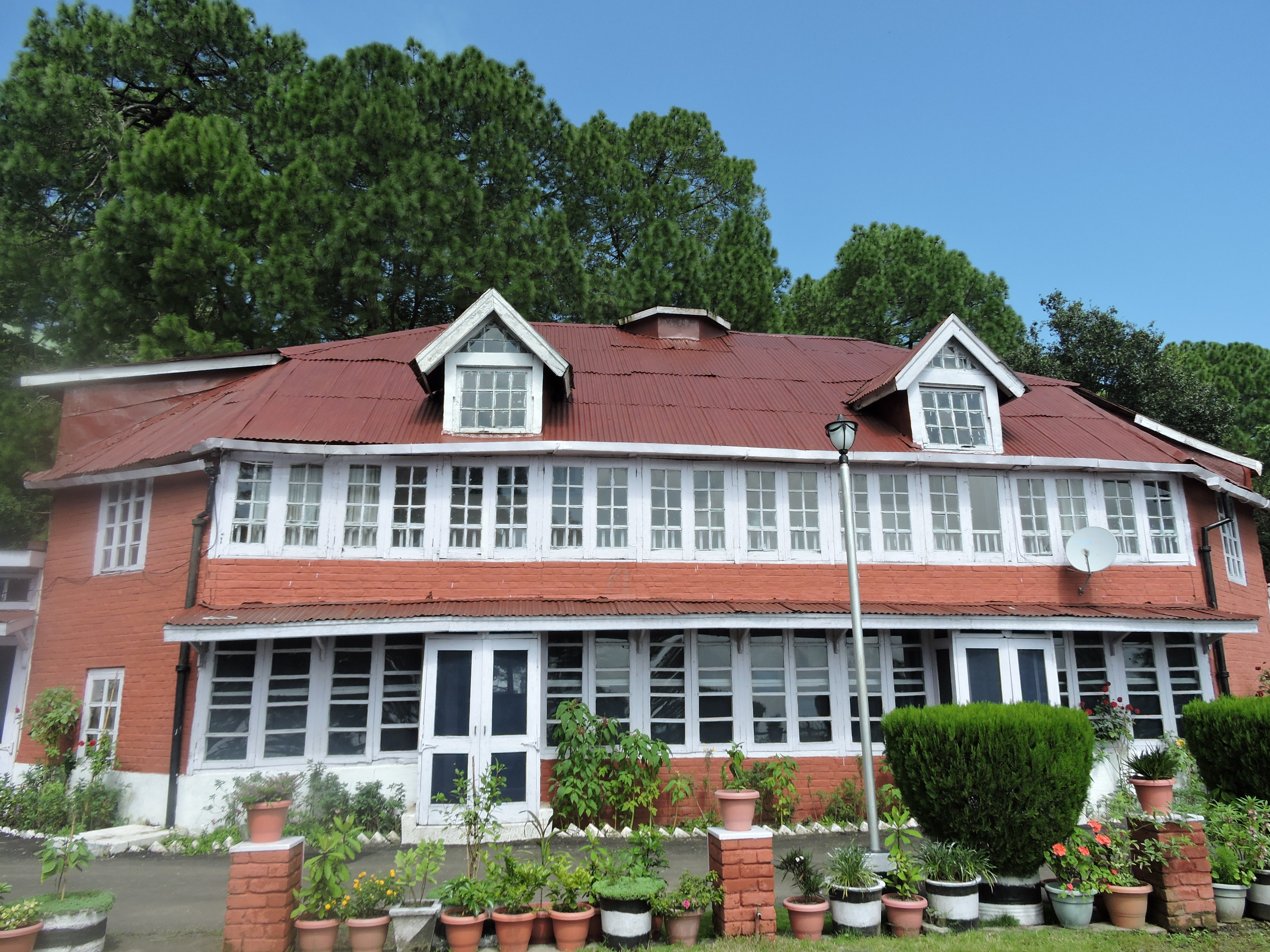
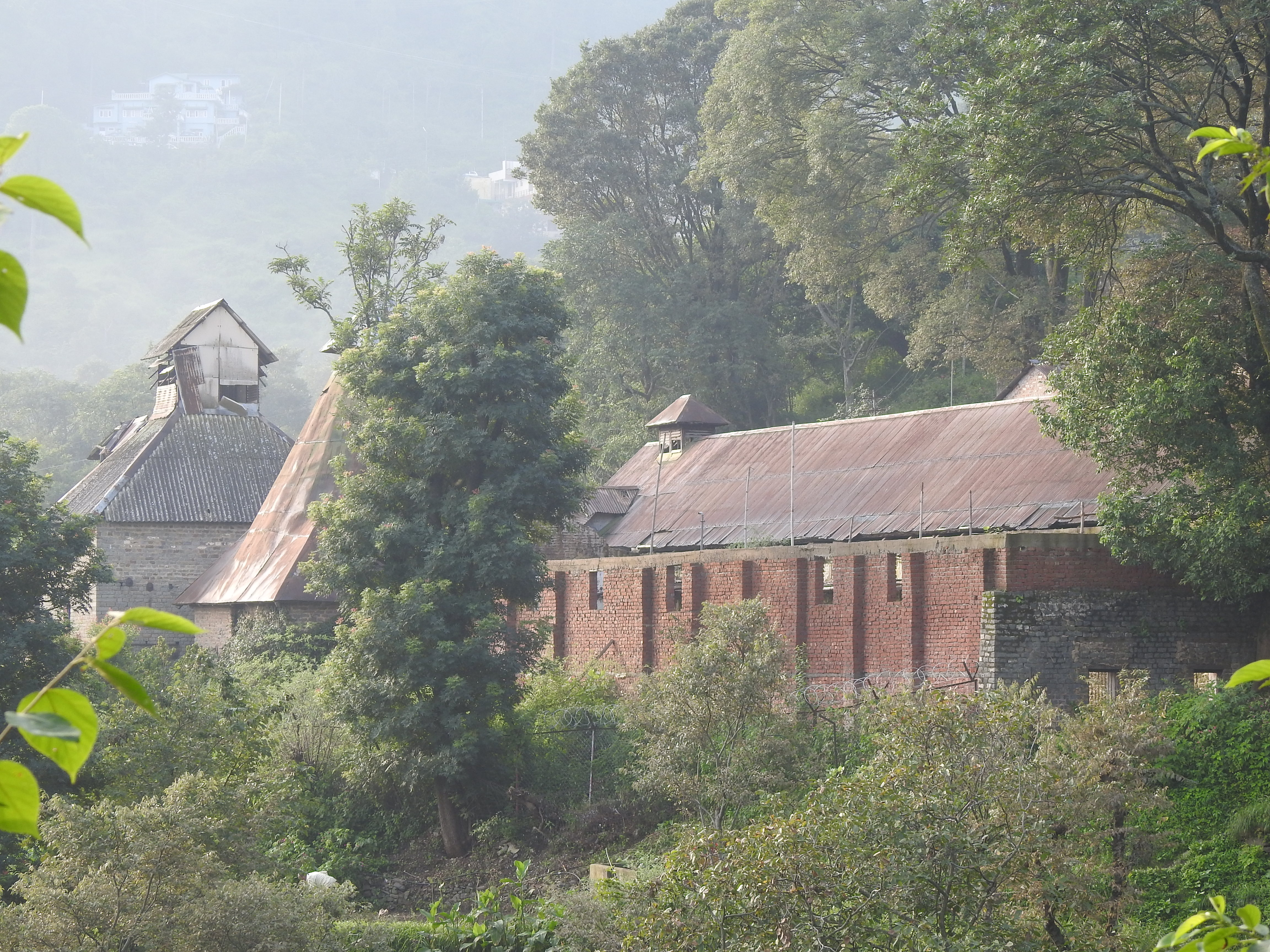
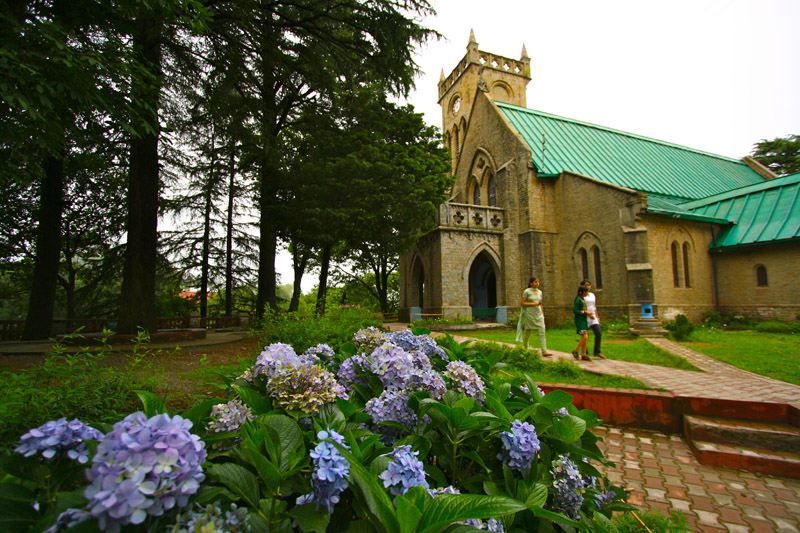
- From top, left to right: Uphill view of Kasauli, Sunset Point, Central Research Institute with Kasauli Tower, Government Circuit House, Kasauli Brewery, Christ Church

- Location in Himachal Pradesh, India Kasauli (India)
- Coordinates: 30.9°N 76.96°E
- Country: India
- State: Himachal Pradesh
- District: Solan
- Elevation: 1,800 m (5,900 ft)

Population (2011)
  - Total: 3,885

Languages
  - Official: Hindi
  - Regional: Mahasui (Baghati)
- Time zone: UTC+5:30 (IST)
- PIN: 173204
- Vehicle registration: HP98

Kasauli (Hindi: [kəsɔːliː]) is a town and cantonment located in Solan district of the Indian state of Himachal Pradesh. The cantonment was established by the British Raj in 1842 as a Colonial hill station, 25 km (16 mi) from Solan, 77 km (48 mi) from Shimla, 58 km (36 mi) from Chandigarh, and 94 km (58 mi) from Ambala Cantt (Haryana), an important railway junction of North India.

== Etymology ==
According to a local legend, there was a stream called Kaushalya or Kausalya that flowed near the area between Jabli and Kasauli, that is how the name Kausalya gradually evolved to Kasauli and got its name.

According to another story, there used to be abundant flowers or plant named Kusmawali or Kusmali as in the local language of the region that is Baghati, dialect of Mahasu Pahari. So that is how after that plant the place got its name, which similarly evolved to Kasauli from Kusmali by the time.

== Demographics ==
Kasauli is a Cantonment Board town in the district of Solan, Himachal Pradesh. The Kasauli town is divided into six wards for which elections are held every five years. The Kasauli Cantonment Board has a population of 3,885, of which 2,183 are males and 1,702 are females, according to a report released by Census India 2011.

The population of children with age of 0-6 is 406 which is 10.45% of total population of Kasauli (CB). In Kasauli Cantonment Board, the female sex ratio is 780 against state average of 972. Moreover, the child sex ratio in Kasauli is around 888 compared to Himachal Pradesh state average of 909. The literacy rate of Kasauli city is 91.23% higher than the state average of 82.80%. In Kasauli, male literacy is around 94.05% while the female literacy rate is 87.56%.

== Climate ==
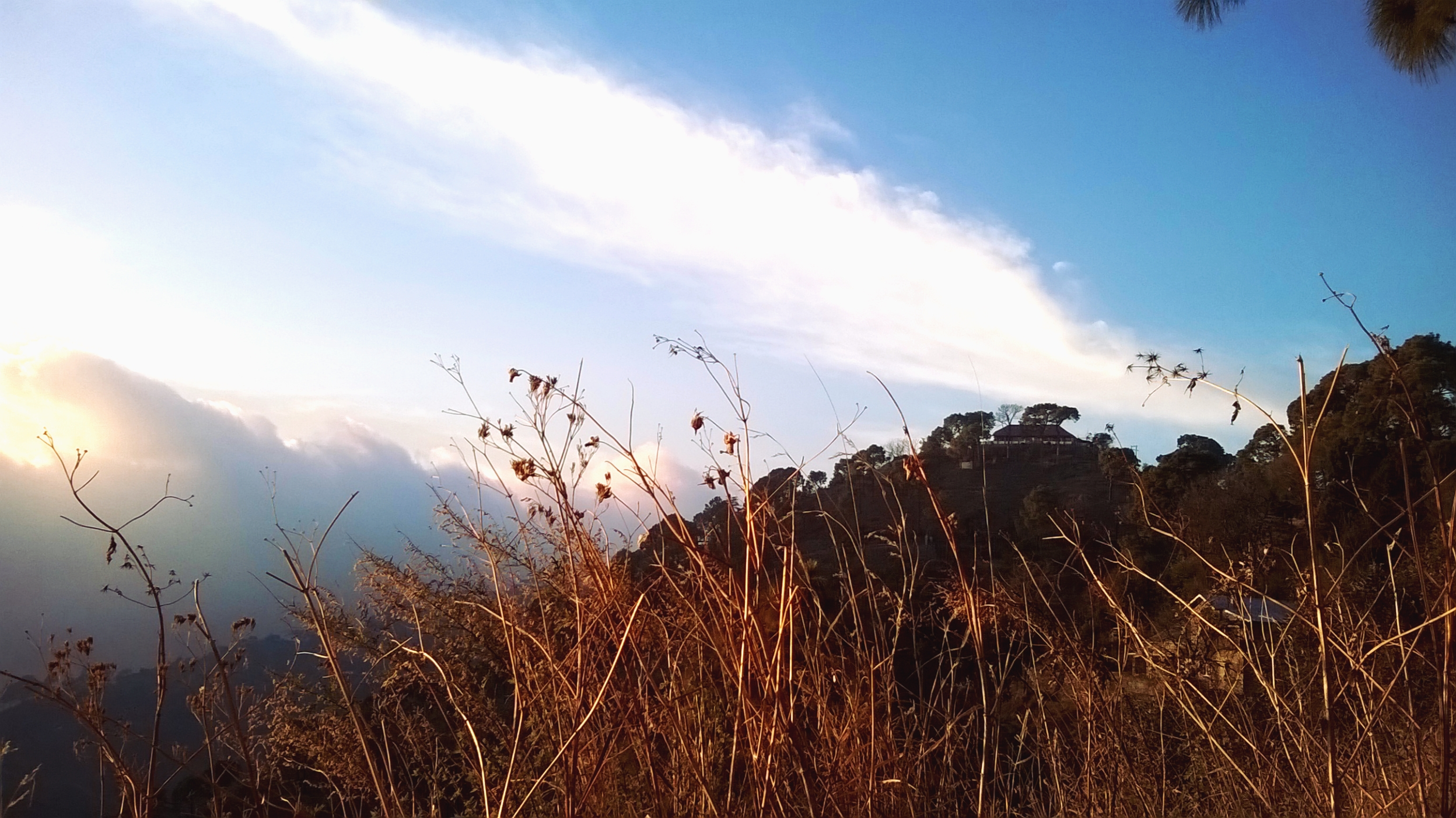
Kasauli on a winter afternoon.

Kasauli has a humid subtropical climate (Cwa), bordering on humid continental (Dwa). Winter temperature is approximately 2 degrees Celsius, the summer temperatures rarely exceeds 32 degrees Celsius or more. The general wind direction is south-west to north-east. Total rainfall for the year is 1020 millimetres, with humidity at 90% in September and 28% in April. Sometimes snowfall is also there during early January and in winters are chilly, there are a couple of frosty nights. Minimum temperature recorded in Kasuli was -6 °C.

== Landmarks ==
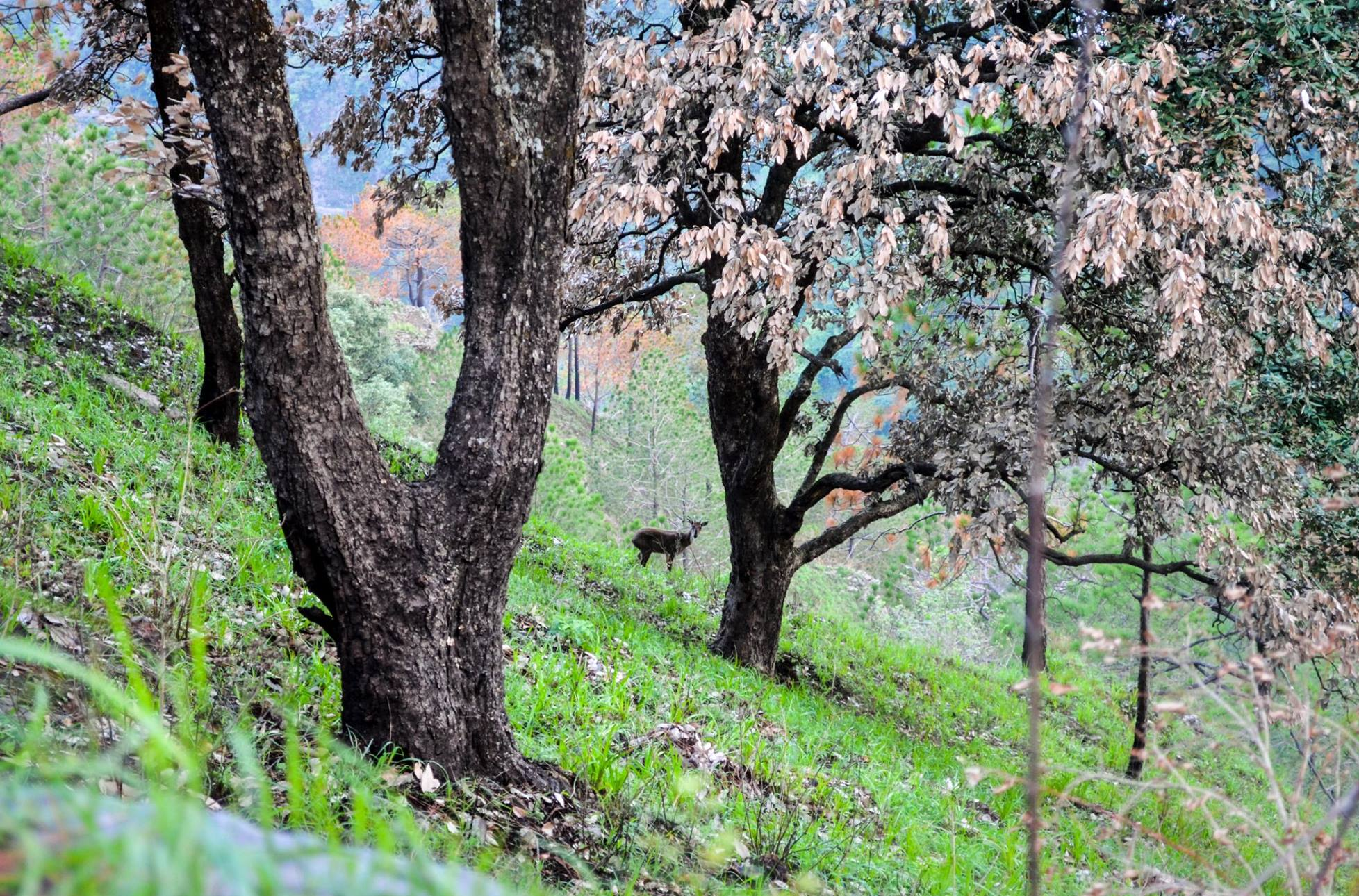
Gilbert trail, Kasauli

=== Central Research Institute ===
The Central Research Institute (CRI), originally the Pasteur Institute of India, was established at Kasauli in 1904 under its first director Sir David Semple, to focus on immunology and virology research.

The CRI works as a World Health Organization 'Collaborating Centre', and as an immuno-biological laboratory producing vaccines for measles and polio, and the DTP group of vaccines. It also provides a Master of Science programme in Microbiology.

=== Baptist Church ===
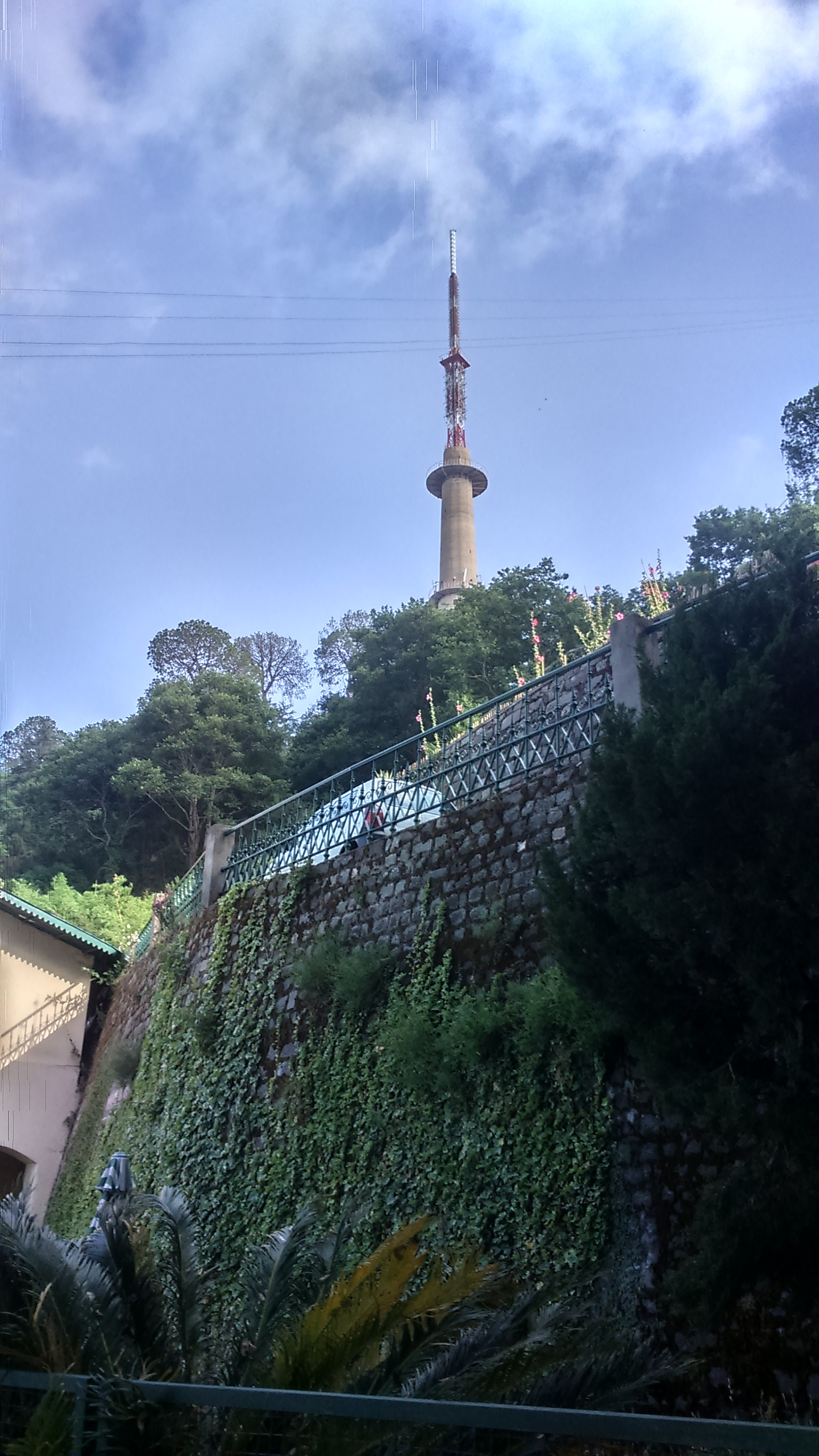
Doordarshan TV tower

Kasauli Baptist Church is a 1923 brick and wood building, situated close to the Sadar Bazzar. According to The Indian Express it is "considered a unique example of colonial architecture of the British era". In 2008 the church was damaged by a fire which destroyed all the internal furnishings.

=== Christ Church ===
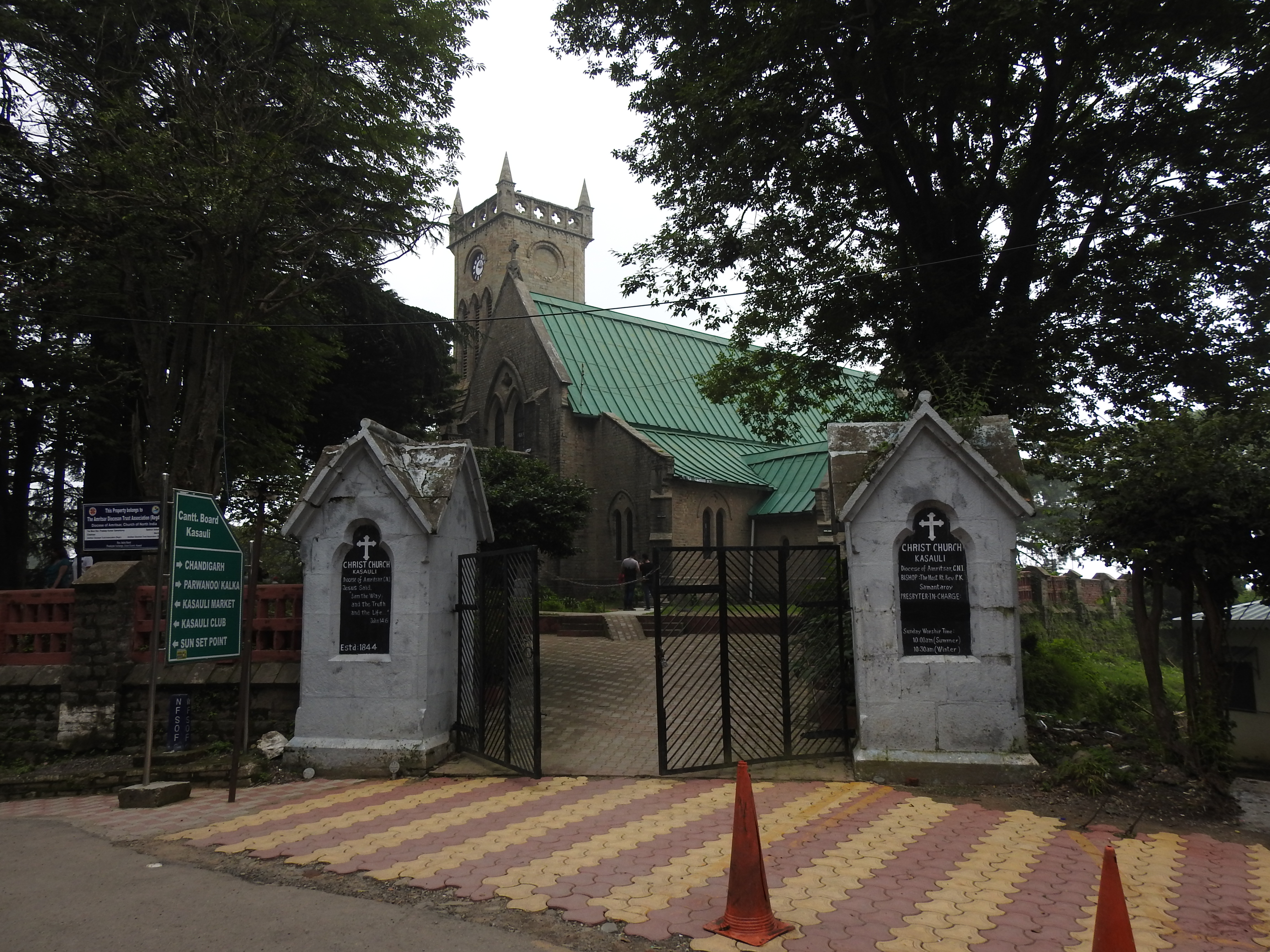
picturesque structure

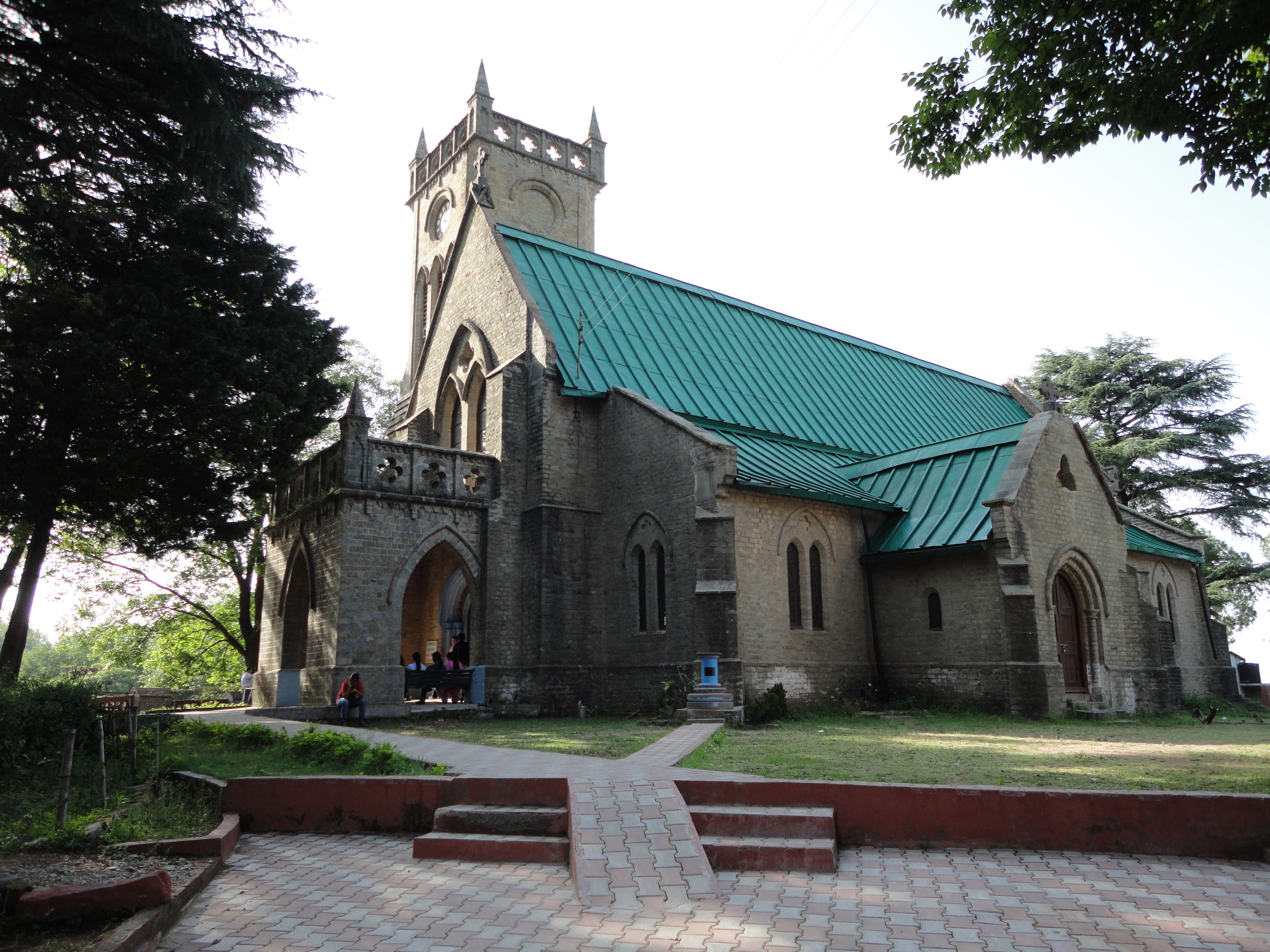
Christ Church, Kasauli.

Christ Church was previously an Anglican church, inaugurated on 24 July 1853.

Christ Church Kasauli came into existence in 1844 when Dr. Daniel Wilson (the great Metropolitan Bishop of Calcutta) appointed the Rev MJ Jennings as chaplain to the new station Kasauli for the first time, who started worship services in a barrack as there was no church building. At the end of October 1844 Dr. Wilson, the Bishop of Calcutta, paid his first visitation of Kasauli and on 26 October laid the foundation stone of the future Christ Church. On 24 July 1853 the shed of the church was completed and on that day the church was used for the worship services for first time.

In the 1880s the church tower was raised and the public clock was placed on it during the leadership of the Rev J.B. Brunesson by importing the same from W.H. Bailey & Co of Manchester, England. The total cost of this was Rs. 2612 and 11 annas towards which Rs. 1250 was given by the Government and the balance raised by public subscription. After remaining in hibernation for many decades, in 2015 the tower clock, started ticking again with the wonderful efforts of a Good Samaritan from Chandigarh and the local EME workshop. The clock still works on mechanical gears and is now in the Limca Book of Records for being the oldest working tower turret clock in India. Since 1970 it has been under the auspices of the Church of North India (CNI) in the diocese of Amritsar. The church contains Spanish and Italian imported stained glass windows depicting Christ, Mary, Saint Barnabas and Saint Francis.

=== Circuit house ===
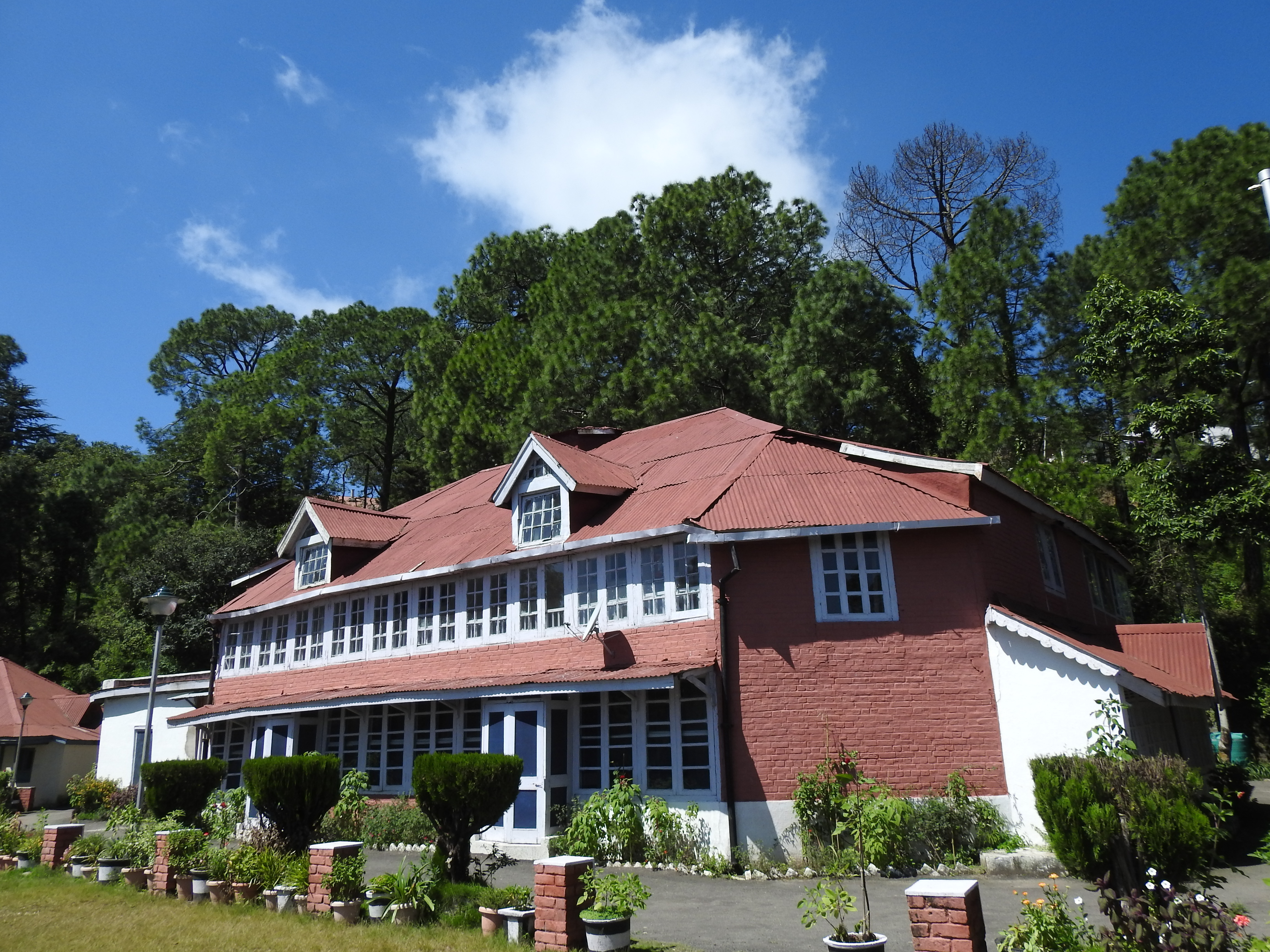
Kasauli Circuit House.

British colonial era heritage building.

=== Gurudwara Shri Guru Nanak Ji ===
The Gurudwara (Sikh house of worship and hospitality) Shri Guru Nanak Ji is located in the Garkhal bazaar near Kasauli.

=== Fossil site ===
Kasauli is one of the fossil sites of Himachal Pradesh, with first fossil find here in 1864, with 20 million year old fossils from Miocene era have been discovered when this area was a coastal area of the Tethys Ocean.

=== Kasauli Brewery and Distillery ===
Kasauli Brewery and Distillery, founded in 1835 during the British Raj by Edward Abraham Dyer father of Colonel Reginald Edward Harry Dyer "butcher of Jallianwala Bagh massacre", started producing Asia's first beer brand, the "Lion Beer", and India's first single malt whisky, the ""Solan No. 1", both of which are still in production.

=== Kasauli Club ===
Kasauli Club is a heritage building which was established by civilians and service personnel in 1880, as the Kasauli Reading and Assembly Rooms. It gained its present name in 1898 when a limited liability company and constitution were established; its first director was Sir David Semple of Kasauli's Pasteur Institute. At the time the club was for the exclusive use of the British Raj, and held social meetings, tea and dinner dances, and galas. In 1915 regimental officers at Dagshai, Solan and Subathu could be admitted as honorary members. At Independence in 1947, plans to sell then loss-making Club failed.

The club was originally constructed of wood and plaster, and was typical of hill architecture. In 2001, after a 2000 restoration, it was destroyed by fire, losing "elegant, old-world furniture, [and] precious and rare books". By 2005 it had been redesigned and rebuilt in stone, and plans were put forward for a new attached gymnasium.

In April 2012 the Kasauli Club hosted a two-day Rhythm and Blues Festival as a benefit concert for ill children.

=== Nahri Temple ===
The Nahri Temple, devoted to the Goddess Durga and Lord Shiva, is thought to have been constructed around a hundred and fifty years ago. Also known as 'Jantar Mantar' and 'Choo Mantar Mahadev Temple', the temple is renowned for its festive celebration of Dushera and Shivratri. The temple boasts striking idols of the goddess Durga and Lord Shiva placed in the chamber of temple. Near this temple, there is century-old bauri which still offers sweet potable water. This temple is known to be visited by hundreds of pilgrims each year to present their prayers.

=== Hanuman Mandir (Manki Point) ===
Monkey Point is situated in the Air Force Station near the Lower Mall region about 4 km (2.5 mi) from the center of town. According to the Ramayana, when Lord Hanuman was returning from the Himalayas after acquiring the "Sanjivani Booty", one of his feet touched the hill; that's why the top of the hill is in the shape of a foot. On clear nights a view of Chandigarh can be seen from Monkey Point.

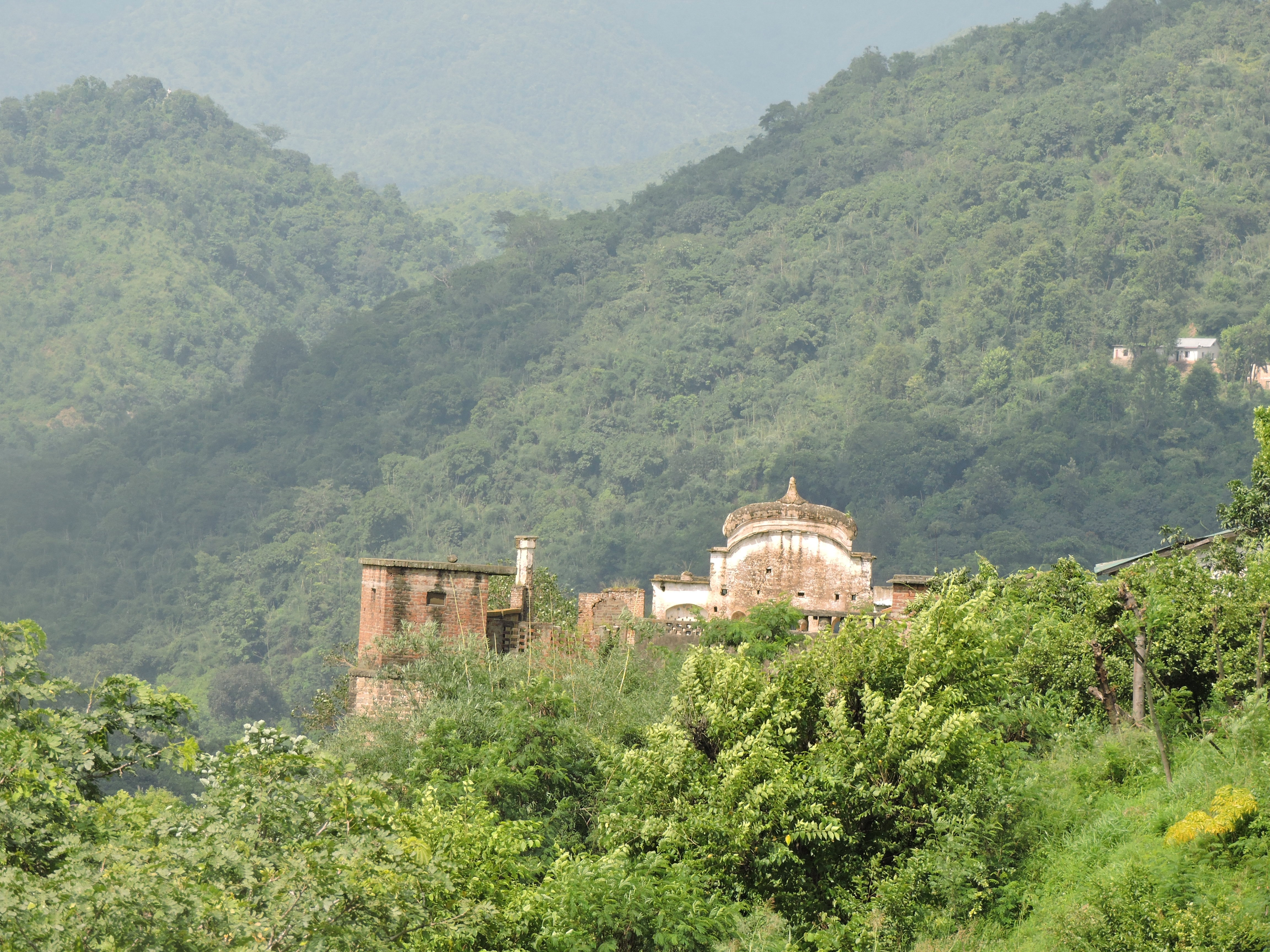
View of Palace and fort of Mahlog State, under Simla Hill States.

=== Beja State ===
Beja State was one of the 18 Simla Hill States, situated just below Kasauli to the west and bordered by Mahlog, Patiala, Kuthar and the Bharauli tract of Simla District around Sabathu. Beja included 45 villages, over an area of 13 km2 or 5 mi2 with 1,131 subjects.

=== Mahlog princely state ===
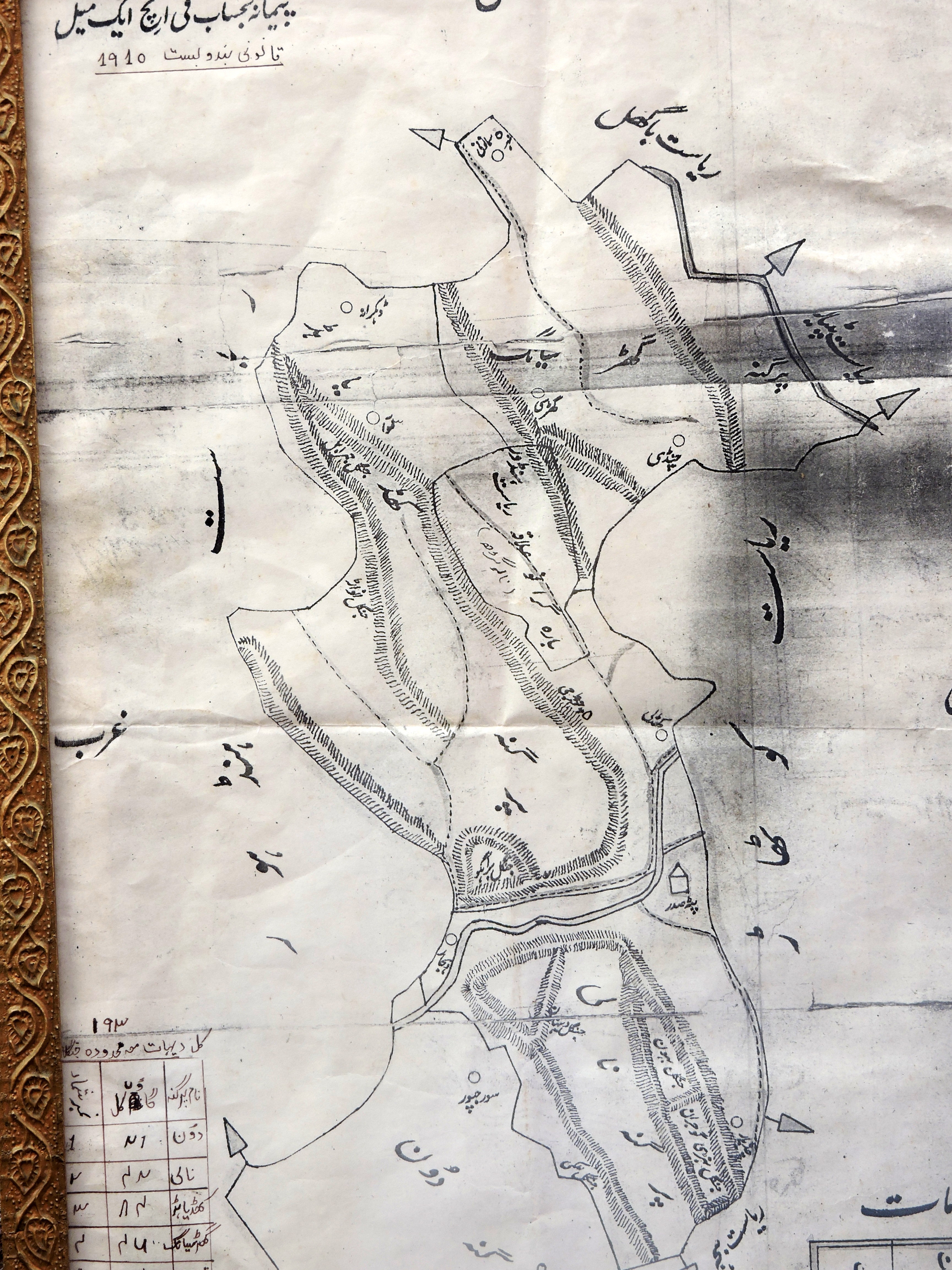
Map of Mahlog State under Simla Hill States, Himachal Pradesh, India.

The princely state of Mahlog was founded in 1183. Its original rulers were ruling earlier near Kalka when Mohamad Gauri attacked that area then they shifted to the Mahlog area. Initially 193 villages were in its jurisdiction but later over 300 villages were included. It was one of the biggest Princely State of Simla Hill States under the British Raj.

== Notable people ==
- Michael Baines, English cricketer and British Army officer
- Frank Blaker, Victoria Cross recipient
- Ruskin Bond, Anglo-Indian author
- Janet Chisholm, British MI6 agent during the Cold War
- Tisca Chopra, Indian film actress
- Andy Mulligan, Irish rugby international
