= Gilbert White (British Army officer) =

English cricketer and British Army officer

Personal information
- Full name: Gilbert William White
- Born: 6 July 1912; Farnham, Surrey, England
- Died: 14 October 1977 (aged 65); La Plaine, Saint Patrick, Dominica
- Batting: Unknown
- Bowling: Unknown
- Relatives: William White (father); Harold Austin (father-in-law)

Career statistics
Competition	First-class
Matches	1
Runs scored	10
Batting average	10.00
100s/50s	–/–
Top score	10
Balls bowled	30
Wickets	0
Bowling average	–
5 wickets in innings	–
10 wickets in match	–
Best bowling	–
Catches/stumpings	–/–
- Source: Cricinfo, 15 April 2019

Brigadier Gilbert William White MBE (6 July 1912 – 14 October 1977) was an English first-class cricketer and British Army officer. His military career serving with the King's Royal Rifle Corps spanned from 1933 to 1961, during which he served with distinction in the Second World War and eventually rose to the rank of brigadier. He also played first-class cricket for the British Army cricket team.

== Early life and military career ==
The son of Brigadier William White, he was born at Farnham and educated at Winchester College, where he played cricket for the college team and headed their batting averages in his final year of study. From Winchester he attended the Royal Military College, Sandhurst. He graduated in February 1933 as a second lieutenant into the King's Royal Rifle Corps. He was promoted to the rank of lieutenant in February 1936. He made a single appearance in first-class cricket for the British Army cricket team against Oxford University at Camberley in 1939. Opening the batting in the Army's first-innings, White scored 10 run before being dismissed by Randle Darwall-Smith. Prior to the Second World War, he had served in operations during the 1936–1939 Arab revolt in Palestine.

== Second World War ==
He served in North Africa during the early stages of the war, with the 7th Armoured Division. In December 1940, he took part in the successful counter-attack against Italian forces at the Battle of Sidi Barrani. In January 1941, he took part in the successful captures of Tobruk and Bardia, followed in February by the Battle of Beda Fomm, which saw the surrender of 25,000 Italians. He was promoted to the rank of captain in February 1941, after which he served as a staff captain. White was made an MBE in July 1941, with his recommendation making note of his "energy, resource and unruffled temperament". He was briefly appointed to Cairo, eventually rejoining the 7th Armoured Division as deputy assistant quarter-master general in June 1941, a role he held until July 1942. He served as assistant adjutant and quarter-master general to the 1st Armoured Division from July 1942 to August 1943, before an appointment as a general staff officer at the War Office. He was mentioned in dispatches in January 1944. He subsequently saw action in North-West Europe.

== Later life ==
Following the war, he was promoted to the rank of major in July 1946. He was promoted to the rank of lieutenant colonel in July 1953. He was promoted to the rank of colonel in December 1955. He was promoted to the rank of brigadier in January 1960. He retired from active service in April 1961, upon which he was placed on the reserve of officers list. Having exceeded the age for recall, he was removed from the reserve list in August 1965.

He spent his final years in Dominica, where he died at La Plaine in October 1977. His father-in-law was the Barbadian politician and first-class cricketer Harold Austin.
