= Catherington =

Village and parish in Hampshire, England

Coordinates: 50.92626°N 1.01164°W

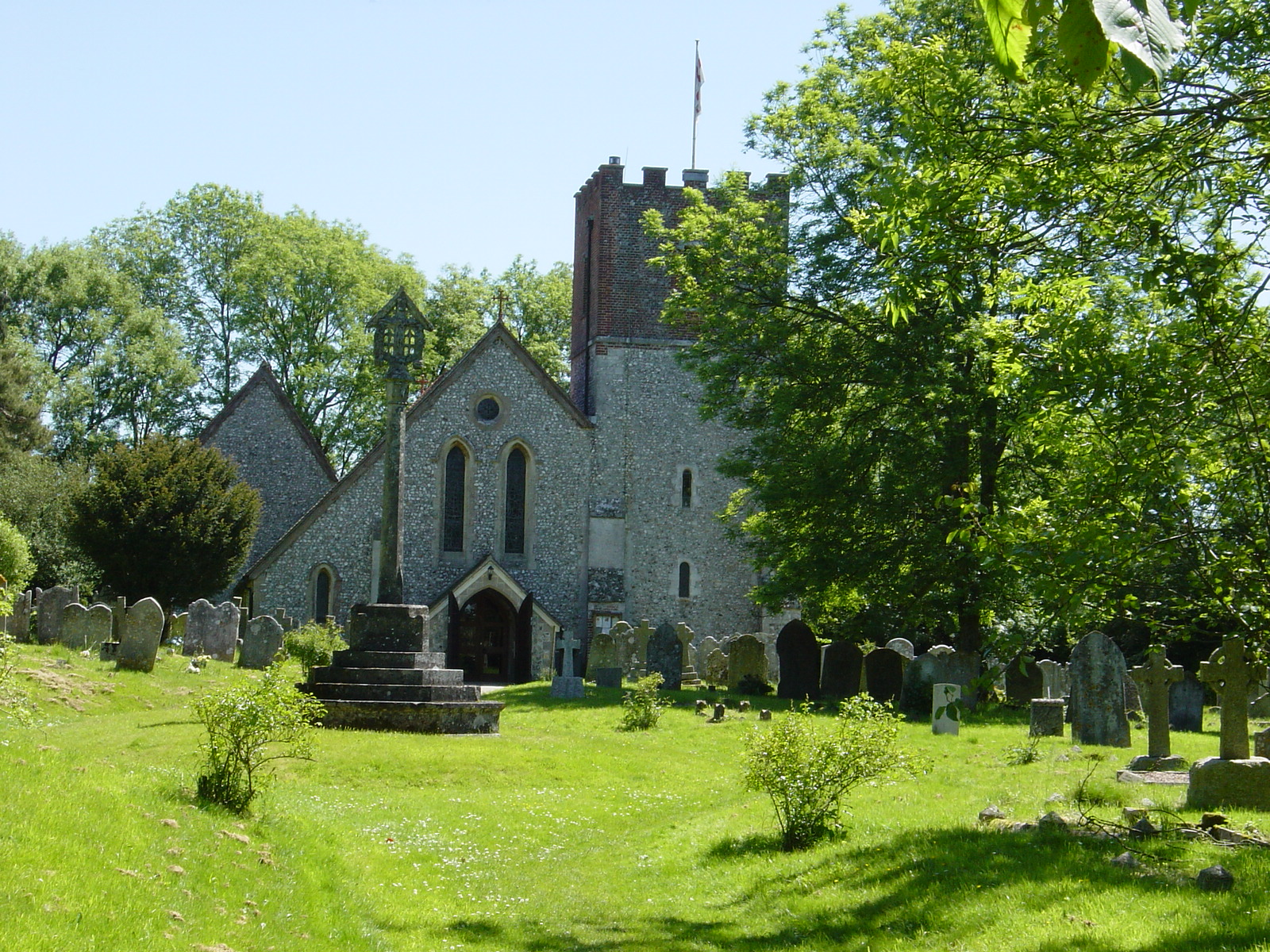
- All Saints Church

- Location within Hampshire
- Population: c.3900 (1998)
- OS grid reference: SU695145
- Civil parish: Horndean
- District: East Hampshire
- Shire county: Hampshire
- Region: South East
- Country: England
- Sovereign state: United Kingdom
- Post town: WATERLOOVILLE
- Postcode district: PO8
- Dialling code: 023
- Police: Hampshire and Isle of Wight
- Fire: Hampshire and Isle of Wight
- Ambulance: South Central
- UK Parliament: East Hampshire

Catherington is a village and former civil parish, now in the parish of Horndean, in the East Hampshire district of Hampshire, England. It is 1 mile (1.8 km) northwest of Horndean. The village is also close to Cowplain and Clanfield. It is situated about 10 miles north of Portsmouth and eight miles south of Petersfield, in the very south of the district of East Hampshire. It has a semi-rural character. Catherington is not a very large village and has an approximate population of 3900 (estimated 1998). The village is a conservation area.

== History ==
The name of Catherington is derived from Cateringatune (first recorded in 1015) and possibly means ‘farmstead of the people living by the hill called Cadeir’, or alternatively ‘farmstead of the family or followers of a man called Cat(t)or’.

The village lies at the top of a hill and is similar to its pre-19th century layout in a linear pattern, with buildings either side of Catherington Lane, the main road in the village. The church in the village is the oldest building in Catherington and dates to the mid 12th century. There are several listed buildings in the village. In 1838 there were three working farms in the village and many of the farm buildings still exist, including a listed Granary building erected in 1820 on the west side of Catherington Lane. There are two Georgian era mansions in the village (St Catherines and Catherington House). The current vicarage was built in 1880, replacing an earlier building. In 1931 the parish had a population of 3833.

== Governance ==
Catherington is in the East Hampshire constituency for elections to the House of Commons. Prior to Brexit in 2020, it was represented by the South East England constituency for the European Union parliament. On 1 April 1932 the parish was abolished and merged with Horndean and Havant.

== Landmarks ==
The village has a medieval church, All Saints’ Church, which is mid 12th century in origin. The church was restored in 1883 by Edmund Ferrey (son of Benjamin Ferrey). The church contains a notable tomb monument to Sir Nicholas Hyde and his wife which occupies the east end of the north chapel. In the churchyard is the tomb of Admiral Sir Charles Napier and a monument to another Admiral, Sir Christopher Cradock, as well as the tomb of Edmund Kean, an actor who had a house in Horndean (some of his later family paid the restoration of the church in the late 19th century).

The church has an early 14th-century painting of the Weighing of souls (also known as the Psychostasia) on the wall of the nave.

Attached to the church is a hall, and there is a public house, The Farmer Inn. It was rebuilt in the 1920s following a fire.

== Culture and community ==
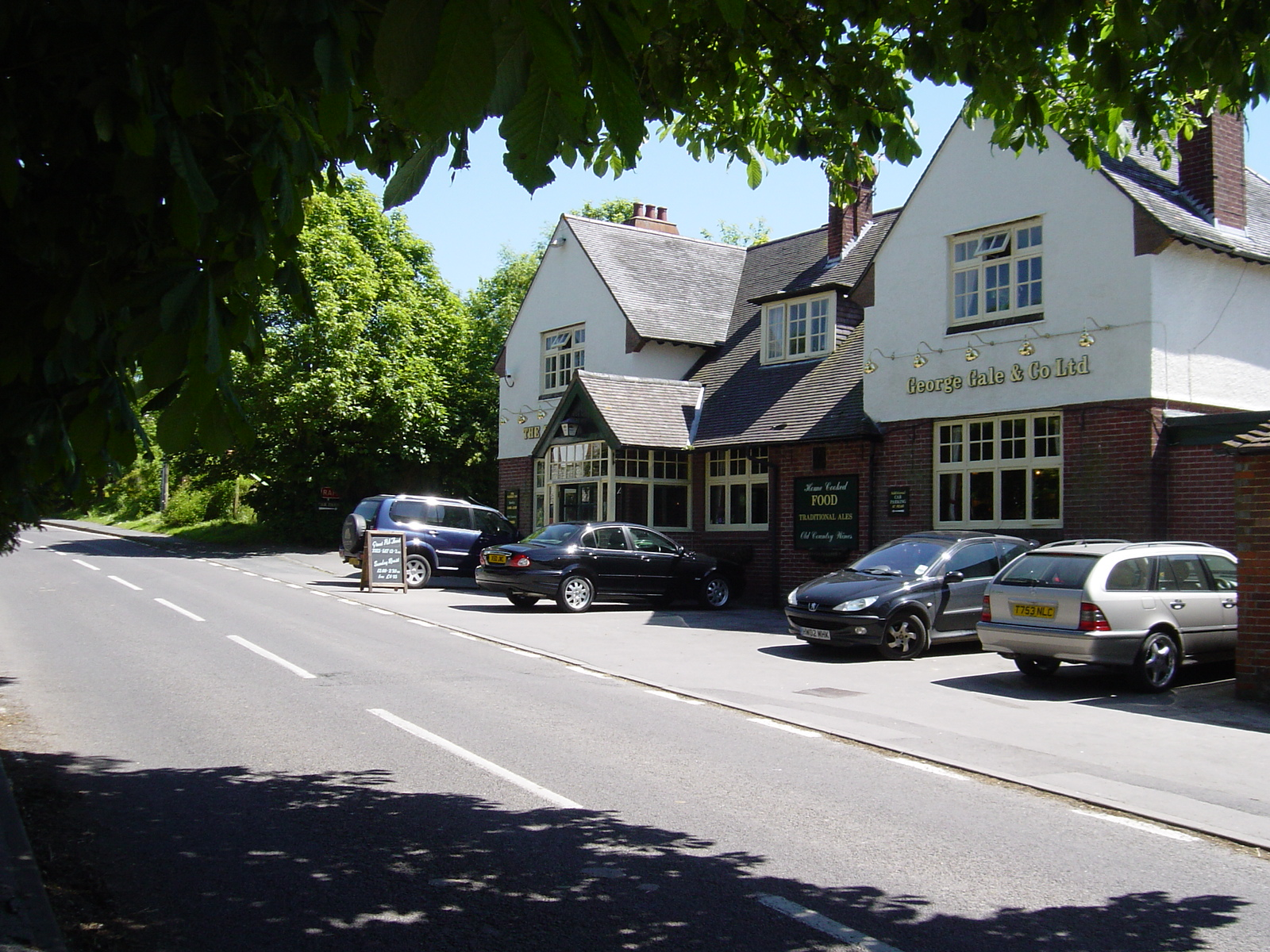
Catherington main street with the Farmer Inn

The main community centre of Catherington is the Church Hall.

There is a pond in the village and there is a car park in the village for access to Catherington Down.

In 2021, the village held an inaugural craft fair.

== Transport ==
The village is just west of the A3 road.

The nearest railway station in 3.3 miles (5.4 km) southeast of the village, at Rowlands Castle.

== Education ==
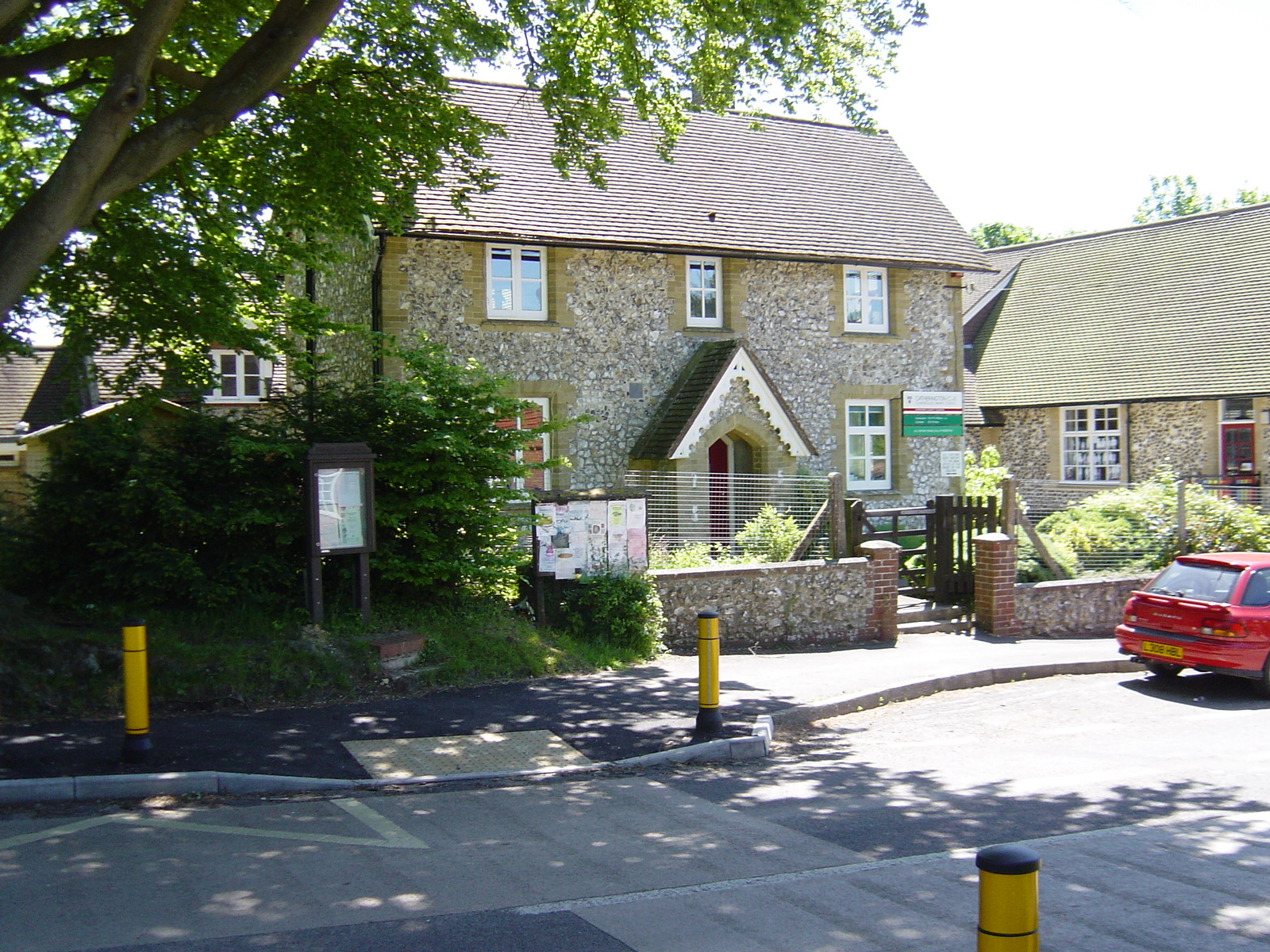
Catherington Infant School

There is a primary school in the village, Catherington C of E Infant School. The school was originally built in 1851 for girls and infants but became a primary school in 1939 and then again at infant school in 1994.

Kingscourt School is a private school in the village. Kingscourt School occupies Catherington House, once the family home of Admiral Samuel Hood (mentor to Lord Nelson) who commissioned the house in 1771. In 2021, land clearance nearby to the school revealed extensive evidence of pre-19th century farm buildings, previously owned by another admiral, Admiral Sir Roger Curtis, and family.

== Media ==
The local newspapers and publications are

- Meon Valley News (Free)
- Petersfield Herald
- The News

== Notable people ==
- Thomas Brett, one of cricket's earliest well-known fast bowlers and a leading player for Hampshire when its team was organised by the Hambledon Club in the 1770s.
- Sir Christopher Cradock, (1862–1914), admiral.
- Sarah Doudney, (1841–1926), novelist, children's writer and hymn writer, lived in the village with her parents until 1871.
- Samuel Hood, 1st Viscount Hood (1724–1816), admiral
- Nicholas Hyde (1572–1631), Lord Chief Justice (entombed in the church)
- Edmund Kean, (1789–1833), actor. Kean had a house in Horndean. His remains may have been moved to Catherington from Richmond, Surrey during restoration work there in 1904.
- Sir Charles Napier, (1786–1860), admiral.
- Caryl Thain (1895–1969), cricketer and President of Surrey County Cricket Club.
