= Catherington Down =

Nature reserve in Hampshire, England

Coordinates: 50.924°N 1.018°W

- Site of Special Scientific Interest
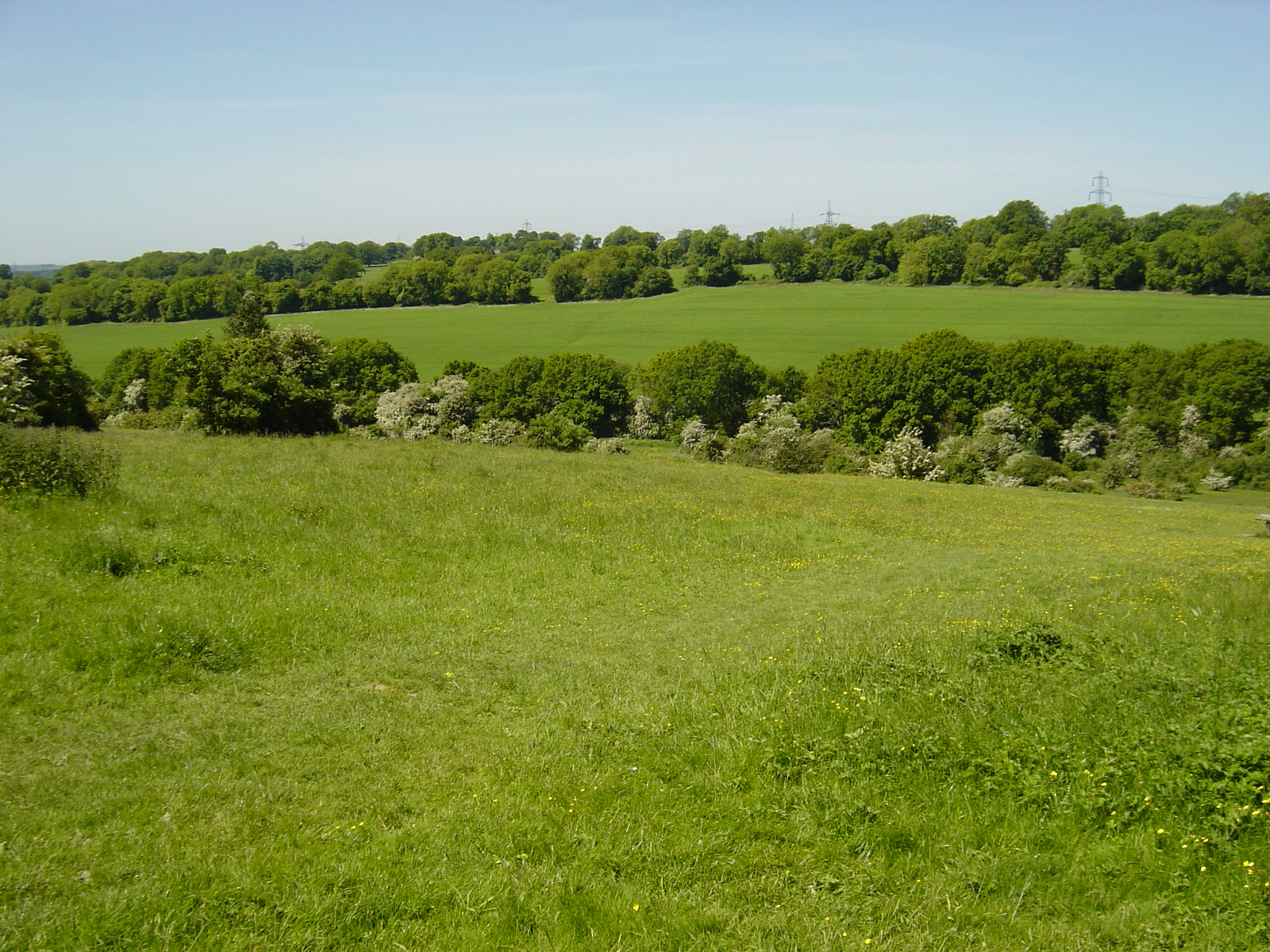
- Location of Catherington Down.
- Area of search: Hampshire
- Grid reference: SU 691 143
- Interest: Biological
- Area: 12.8 hectares (32 acres)
- Notification date: 1984
- Location map: Magic Map

Catherington Down is a 12.8-hectare (32-acre) biological Site of Special Scientific Interest in Catherington in Hampshire. It is also a Local Nature Reserve

This western sloping site is chalk grassland with prominent lynchet strips dating to the Middle Ages. It is managed by grazing and has a variety of chalk herbs, such as pyramidal orchid, round-headed rampion and autumn lady's-tresses. There is also a narrow belt of woodland.

There is access by footpaths from Catherington Lane.
