= Edmund Thomson =

British cricketer and army officer

Personal information
- Full name: Edmund Peel Thomson
- Born: 22 April 1874; Moss Side, Lancashire, England
- Died: 21 December 1914 (aged 40); Festubert, Pas-de-Calais, France
- Batting: Right-handed

Domestic team information
- Years: Team
- 1912: Wiltshire
- 1913–1914: Marylebone Cricket Club

Career statistics
| Competition | First-class |
|---|---|
| Matches | 6 |
| Runs scored | 201 |
| Batting average | 18.27 |
| 100s/50s | –/1 |
| Top score | 53 |
| Catches/stumpings | 1/– |
- Source: Cricinfo, 23 April 2019

Edmund Peel Thomson (22 April 1874 – 21 December 1914) was an English first-class cricketer and British Army officer. Thomson served with the Royal Munster Fusiliers from 1893 to 1914, serving in both the Second Boer War and the First World War, in which he was killed in the latter. He also played first-class cricket for the Marylebone Cricket Club, Free Foresters and the British Army cricket team.

== Life and military career ==
The son of William Thomson, he was born at Moss Side in Manchester. He was educated firstly at Reverend E. W. Hobson's school in Southport, before attending Fettes College in Edinburgh. After leaving Fettes, he decided on a career in the army and attended the Royal Military College, Sandhurst. He graduated from Sandhurst in October 1893, entering into the Royal Munster Fusiliers as a second lieutenant. He was promoted to the rank of lieutenant in February 1896, and served as the adjutant of the 2nd battalion from 1899 to 1903. He was promoted to the rank of captain in July 1901. Thomson served with his battalion in the Second Boer War and was present during operations in the Transvaal, for which he was mentioned in dispatches in July 1902. After the end of the war that month, Thomson left South Africa with other men of his battalion on the SS Orient in October 1902, and was stationed in Ireland. He later returned to South Africa and served as a staff captain for the Pretoria sub-district from March 1906 to June 1909.

He was promoted to the rank of major in March 1912, while in May 1912 he was made a brigade-major and seconded to the Middlesex Infantry Brigade. In July of the same year he appeared in a Minor Counties Championship match for Wiltshire. He made his debut in first-class cricket for the Marylebone Cricket Club (MCC) against Kent at Lord's in May 1913. He appeared in two further first-class fixtures in 1913, playing for the MCC against Hampshire and for the Free Foresters against Oxford University. He made three further first-class appearances in 1914, playing twice for the MCC against Yorkshire and Hampshire, as well as appearing for the British Army cricket team against Cambridge University at Fenner's. In six first-class matches, Thomson scored 201 runs at an average of 18.27, with a high score of 53.

At the start of the First World War in July 1914, he was still serving with the Middlesex Infantry Brigade, but returned to the Royal Munster Fusiliers in October 1914. He was killed in action on 21 December 1914, while leading an attack on German trenches at Festubert in France. His body was not recovered from the battlefield and he was later commemorated at the Le Touret Memorial.
