= Colin Cokayne-Frith =

English cricketer and British Army officer (1900–1940)

Personal information
- Full name: Colin Cokayne-Frith
- Born: 27 March 1900; Canterbury, Kent, England
- Died: 18 May 1940 (aged 40); Assche, Brabant, Belgium
- Batting: Right-handed

Career statistics
Competition	First-class
Matches	1
Runs scored	54
Batting average	54.00
100s/50s	–/1
Top score	54
Catches/stumpings	1/–
- Source: Cricinfo, 5 April 2019

Colin Cokayne-Frith (27 March 1900 – 18 May 1940) was an English first-class cricketer and British Army officer. Cokayne-Frith graduated from Sandhurst during the latter stages of the First World War and served in its closing stages with the King's Royal Hussars. He later played first-class cricket for the British Army cricket team. He was killed in action during the Battle of Belgium in the Second World War, while commanding a tank during the British Expeditionary Force's retreat to Dunkirk.

== Life and military career ==
Cokayne-Frith was born at St Stephen's House at Canterbury to Lieutenant Colonel Reginald Cokayne-Frith and his wife, Pauline. He was educated at Eton College, before attending the Royal Military College, Sandhurst.

He graduated from Sandhurst in the later stages of World War I as a second lieutenant, entering into the King's Royal Hussars and seeing action on the Western Front. He was promoted to the temporary rank of lieutenant in December 1919, with full promotion to the rank following in December 1921. He was made an adjutant in April 1928, and was shortly thereafter promoted to the rank of captain in July 1928. He was again made an adjutant in September 1933, when he was seconded to the North Somerset Yeomanry. He remained seconded to the North Somerset Yeomanry until November 1937, returning to the King's Royal Hussars in January 1938. He was promoted to the rank of major in August 1938. He played a single first-class cricket match for the British Army cricket team against Cambridge University at Fenner's in 1939. Batting once in the match, he scored 54 runs in the Army's first-innings, before being dismissed caught by George Mann off his brother John Mann's bowling.

He served with the King's Royal Hussars during the Second World War, seeing action during the Battle of Belgium. He was killed in a rearguard action on 18 May 1940, during the British Expeditionary Force's retreat to Dunkirk, when his tank was destroyed by a German anti-tank gun in the Belgian town of Assche. He was the most senior member of his regiment to be killed on that day. He was posthumously mentioned in dispatches for his actions throughout the retreat.
