= George Grimston =

English cricketer

George Sylvester Grimston (2 April 1905 – 18 September 1990) was an English cricketer active from 1924 to 1939 who played for Sussex. He was born in Rawalpindi and died in Brighton. He appeared in 26 first-class matches as a righthanded batsman who bowled right arm medium-fast pace and leg breaks. He scored 826 runs with a highest score of 104 and took eleven wickets with a best performance of five for 40.
