= Percival Sanger =

English cricketer, polo player, and British Army officer

Personal information
- Full name: Percival Bertram Sanger
- Born: 19 October 1899; Reading, Berkshire, England
- Died: 17 September 1968 (aged 68); Avebury, Wiltshire, England
- Batting: Right-handed
- Role: Wicket-keeper

Career statistics
Competition	First-class
Matches	1
Runs scored	2
Batting average	2.00
100s/50s	–/–
Top score	2
Catches/stumpings	2/1
- Source: Cricinfo, 13 April 2019

Percival Bertram Sanger (19 October 1899 – 17 September 1968) was an English first-class cricketer, polo champion and British Army officer. In a military career which spanned from 1918–1947, he served in both the British Army and the British Indian Army. Additionally, he played first-class cricket for the British Army cricket team, as well as winning the prestigious Hurlingham Club Championship in polo.

== Life and military career ==
Sanger was born at Reading and was educated at Cheltenham College. From there he attended the Royal Military Academy, Woolwich, graduating in June 1918 as a second lieutenant in the Royal Field Artillery and serving in the latter stages of the First World War. He made a single appearance in first-class cricket for the British Army cricket team against the Royal Navy at Lord's in July 1925. Batting once in the match, he scored 2 runs in the Army's only innings, before being dismissed by Dallas Brooks. Playing as a wicket-keeper, he also took two catches and made a single stumping.

He was seconded for service with the Colonial Office in September 1925, by which point he held the rank of lieutenant. He was granted the temporary rank of captain in March 1929, while serving with the Royal West African Frontier Force. He was restored to the Royal Artillery in November 1929, after ceasing to be employed in the Royal West African Frontier Force. By 1931, Sanger was serving in the British Indian Army as a captain. He was promoted to the rank of major in September 1938. He served during the Second World War with the British Indian Army as part of the Prince Albert Victor's Own Cavalry. Following the conclusion of the war, Sanger was promoted to the rank of lieutenant colonel in December 1945, with seniority antedated to June 1944.

While serving in India he was a noted 8-goal handicap polo player. Sanger took part in the Inter-regimental Tournament, the Western India Championship, the Radha Mohan Tournament, and the Queen's Bay Challenge Cup. In England he was a previous Hurlingham Club champion and winner of the Hargreaves (Warwickshire) Cup. He retired from active service with the British Indian Army in April 1947, retaining the rank of lieutenant colonel. In retirement he was appointed to the British Army's Regular Army Reserve of Officers as a lieutenant colonel in the Royal Armoured Corps in January 1949. Having exceeded the age for recall, he was removed from the reserve of officers list in October 1954. He died in September 1968 at Avebury, Wiltshire.
