= Roland Tudor =

English cricketer

Roland Grimston Tudor (4 December 1890 – 11 October 1973) was an English cricketer active from 1912 to 1919 who played for Sussex. He was born in Willingdon, Sussex and died in Lewes. He appeared in five first-class matches and scored 94 runs with a highest score of 25 not out.
