= William White (British Army officer) =

English cricketer and British Army officer

Personal information
- Full name: William Nicholas White
- Born: 10 September 1879; St Pancras, London, England
- Died: 27 December 1951 (aged 72); Poltimore, Devon, England
- Batting: Right-handed
- Bowling: Unknown
- Relatives: Gilbert White (son)

Domestic team information
- Years: Team
- 1903: Hampshire
- 1904–1906: Barbados
- 1907–1914: Hampshire
- 1908: Marylebone Cricket Club

Career statistics
Competition	First-class
Matches	72
Runs scored	3,225
Batting average	26.21
100s/50s	2/22
Top score	160*
Balls bowled	47
Wickets	0
Bowling average	–
5 wickets in innings	–
10 wickets in match	–
Best bowling	–
Catches/stumpings	42/–
- Source: Cricinfo, 17 February 2010

William Nicholas White CB DSO (10 September 1879 – 27 December 1951) was an English first-class cricketer and an officer in the British Army. A career officer, he started his military career in the militia with the Sherwood Foresters in 1900, and shortly thereafter he joined the Army Service Corps (later Royal Army Service Corps) and remained with the corps until his retirement in 1936. He saw action during his career in both the Second Boer and First World War's. As a cricketer, he made over seventy appearances in first-class cricket, the majority of which came for Hampshire, though he also played at first-class level for services teams. His first-class career yielded him over 3,200 runs and he made two centuries. White was also active in army football as both a player and an administrator, being chairman of the Army Football Association.

== Early life and military career ==
The son of William Nicholas White senior, he was born at St Pancras in September 1879. He was educated at Malvern College, where he played cricket and football for the college eleven. From there, he joined the British Army, gaining a commission as a second lieutenant in a militia battalion as part of the Sherwood Foresters in February 1900. He was promoted to lieutenant in December 1900, before he was transferred to the Army Service Corps (ASC) in December 1901, though he reverted to the rank of second lieutenant. White served in the Second Boer War, with his participation making him eligible to receive the Queen's South Africa Medal. He was active in army football, captaining the British Army football team in the 1901–02 season. White later gained back the rank of lieutenant in January 1903, having completed his probationary period in the ASC. Later in July 1903, he made his debut in first-class cricket for Hampshire against the Gentlemen of Philadelphia at Southampton in 1903, with White being dismissed without scoring in his only innings in the match by John Lester.

Shortly after, his military service took him to British Barbados. There he played inter-colonial first-class cricket for the Barbados cricket team, making six appearances for the team between 1904 and 1906: playing four matches in the Inter-Colonial Tournament and two against Lord Brackley's touring team. He returned home in later 1906, being promoted to captain in November and was appointed commander of the ASC depot at Aldershot Garrison. Having played services cricket for the British Army cricket team, White resumed playing for Hampshire, making two appearances in the 1907 County Championship, before establishing himself in the Hampshire side in 1908 when he made fifteen appearances, scoring 656 runs at an average of 27.33. The following season he made a further fifteen first-class appearances (including one of the Marylebone Cricket Club against Cambridge University), scoring 873 runs at an average of 34.92; he recorded his maiden century in 1909, an unbeaten score of 160 against Gloucestershire, with White having made 71 in Hampshire's first innings.

In 1910, White made thirteen first-class appearances (including playing for a combined Army and Navy team against a combined Oxford and Cambridge Universities team) and scored his second century, making 117 runs against Derbyshire; in the wider season, he scored 524 runs at an average of 22.78. At the beginning of 1912, White was seconded for service as an adjutant with the West Riding Divisional Transport and Supply Column, which necessitated his relocation to the West Riding of Yorkshire. This in-turn limited his availability for Hampshire, with him making three appearances in the 1912 County Championship, four in the 1913 County Championship, and one in the 1914 County Championship; the latter appearance came just weeks before the start of the First World War, marking the end of his career with Hampshire. In total, White made 61 first-class appearances for Hampshire, scoring 2,827 runs at an average of 27.44. Alongside his two centuries, he also made 21 half centuries.

== World War I and later life ==
A month into the war, White was seconded for service as an instructor at the Army Service Corps Training Establishment. He was promoted to major in December 1914, the same month he was appointed to the staff as a Deputy Assistant Director of Transport. He was made a temporary lieutenant colonel in December 1915, upon his elevation to Assistant Director. White was made a Companion of the Distinguished Service Order in January 1916. Throughout the course of the war, he was mentioned in despatches on three occasions.

Following the end of the war, he spent time on the staff at Eastern Command. He resumed playing first-class cricket in 1921, making two appearances for the British Army cricket team against Oxford University and the Royal Navy. The following year, he made a final first-class appearance for the Combined Services cricket team against Essex. He was promoted to lieutenant colonel in January 1925, with promotion to colonel following in April 1929. White returned to Aldershot in 1930, when he was appointed commandant of the Royal Army Service Corps (RASC) training centre. He retained this command until August 1933, when he was appointed inspector of the RASC and granted the temporary rank of brigadier. White was made a Companion of the Order of the Bath in June 1936, prior to his retirement in August of the same year, at which point he was granted the honorary rank of brigadier.

After the war, White had served as chairman of the Army Football Association and sat on its committee, and was active in a number of other military and sporting organisations or committees. He died in December 1951 at a nursing home in Poltimore, Devon. He was married to Evelyn Laura Gilbert-Carter, daughter of Sir Gilbert Thomas Carter; he was survived by her and their two children. Their son, Gilbert, also reached the rank of brigadier in the British Army and played first-class cricket.
