= Frank Dutnall =

English cricketer (1895–1971)

Personal information
- Full name: Frank Dutnall
- Born: 30 March 1895; Canterbury, Kent
- Died: 24 October 1971 (aged 76); Burnley, Lancashire
- Batting: Right-handed
- Bowling: Right-arm medium
- Relatives: William Dutnall (brother)

Domestic team information
- Years: Team
- 1919–1920: Kent
- FC debut: 30 July 1919 Kent v Middlesex
- Last FC: 29 May 1920 Kent v Leicestershire

Career statistics
Competition	First-class
Matches	4
Runs scored	26
Batting average	5.20
100s/50s	0/0
Top score	16
Balls bowled	12
Wickets	0
Bowling average	–
5 wickets in innings	–
10 wickets in match	–
Best bowling	–
Catches/stumpings	1/–
- Source: CricInfo, 13 May 2013

Frank Dutnall (30 March 1895 – 24 October 1971) was an English professional cricketer. Dutnall was a right-handed batsman who bowled right-arm medium pace.

Born at Canterbury in Kent in 1895, Dutnall was the youngest son of pub landlord William Dutnall and his wife Amy. He worked as a clerk in a coal merchant's business. Dutnall first played for Kent Second XI in the Minor Counties Championship in 1912, and was soon a team regular. He was the leading run-scorer for the Second XI in 1914, scoring a century against Surrey Second XI.

During World War I he worked initially as a civilian clerk in the Cavalry Record Office in Canterbury before being enlisted in the same role in 1915. He was discharged in July 1916 and any further war service is unknown.

After the war Dutnall returned to cricket, making his first-class cricket debut in July 1919 for Kent against Middlesex at Maidstone. He made three further first-class appearances during the 1920 season and continued to play regularly for the Second XI until the end of the 1921 season.

Dutnall moved to Lancashire and played as a club professional in the Lancashire League, initially with Enfield Cricket Club in Accrington and then from 1924 to 1928 for Burnley Cricket Club. After one season as the professional at Church Cricket Club in 1929 his professional career came to an end, although he played regularly again for Burnley from 1938 until the 1942 season. He played 225 league matches for Burnley, scoring over 3,000 runs and taking nearly 500 wickets for the club.

Dutnall married Emily Jones in Canterbury in 1925 and ran an athletic outfitters business in Burnley. He died in Burnley in 1971 aged 76. His brother, William Dutnall, also played for Kent.

== Bibliography ==
- Carlaw, Derek (2020). Kent County Cricketers, A to Z: Part Two (1919–1939) (PDF). Cardiff: ACS.
