= Reginald Hudson =

Indian/English cricketer

Cricket information
- Batting: Right-handed
- Bowling: Right-arm medium

Career statistics
| Competition | First-class |
|---|---|
| Matches | 27 |
| Runs scored | 1,807 |
| Batting average | 40.15 |
| 100s/50s | 5/8 |
| Top score | 217 |
| Balls bowled | 12 |
| Wickets | 0 |
| Bowling average | – |
| 5 wickets in innings | – |
| 10 wickets in match | – |
| Best bowling | – |
| Catches/stumpings | 7/0 |
- Source: CricInfo

Brigadier Reginald Eustace Hamilton Hudson (22 August 1904 – 26 May 1995) was a first-class cricketer based in India. A British soldier, Hudson played for the British Army cricket team and the Europeans. His highest score of 217 was made in 225 minutes against the RAF at The Oval in 1932. The following year he made 181 against the West Indies. His brother, Eric Hudson, also played first-class cricket.
