= Robert Whitaker (surgeon) =

British retired surgeon

Robert H. Whitaker, FRCS, is a retired surgeon, who now works as a lecturer and dissection demonstrator at the University of Cambridge, and examiner at the Royal College of Surgeons. He is the co-author of the book Instant Anatomy.

Whitaker graduated with a BA degree in medical science from the University of Cambridge and continued his medical training at University College Hospital, London. He spent a year at Johns Hopkins Hospital, Baltimore, in the Urological Research Laboratories before returning to continue his training at the St Peters Hospital group in London. He was a Senior Lecturer in Urology at the London Hospital Medical School before starting work as a Consultant Paediatric Urology surgeon at Addenbrooke's Hospital, Cambridge in 1973. Since his retirement from the NHS he has worked with trainee surgeons and medical students at the University of Cambridge Department of Anatomy and is a senior examiner at the Royal College of Surgeons, the governing body of surgeons in England.

== Instant Anatomy ==
Instant Anatomy is a reference book for students of human anatomy. It includes several schematic diagrams and pictures, many of which are drawn by Whitaker himself. The intention is to simplify the regions of anatomy, thereby making it easier to remember parts, creating an 'instant' summary. The book is divided up into sections for arteries, veins, lymphatics, autonomic nervous system, cranial nerves, peripheral nerves, dermatomes and cutaneous nerve distribution, muscles, joints, ossification times, foramina - skull and spine, spaces other than skull and spine, position of structures according to vertebral levels and pharyngeal derivatives. There is also an accompanying website, which has several more pictures, podcasts and video teaching. It is clear from the 'guestbook' of the website that it is used and appreciated by many people all around the world in their studies of anatomy.
