= Robert Whitaker (minister) =

British Baptist minister (1863–1944)

Robert Burdette Whitaker
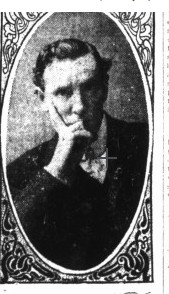
- Portrait of Robert Burdette Whitaker, c. 1898
- Born: 1863
- Died: 1944 (aged 80–81)

Robert Whitaker was a Baptist minister and political activist born in 1863 in Padiham, Lancashire, England. He died in Los Gatos, California in June 1944. In 1869 he moved with his family to the United States. After attending Andover Newton Theological School he went on to hold several pastorates in the western United States including in Oakland, California, Los Gatos, California, and Seattle, Washington.

Whitaker was heavily involved in socialist and labor organizations in California. He was acquainted with other activists such as Eugene Debs, Upton Sinclair, Jack London, and Fanny Bixby Spencer and spent considerable energy agitating for socialist causes. To this end, he lectured frequently around California and founded several presses such as The Progressive Publishing Company, U.F.I. Press, and Whitaker and Ray, Co. He was also a progressive reformer of the church. By 1912, he along with members of the Los Gatos Baptist Church, decided to cancel all "ritualistic ceremonies" and make baptism optional.

== Ministry ==
Whitaker served as a missionary in Mexico from 1887 to 1888. In 1898, he was appointed Superintendent of State Missions for Northern and Central California and gave sermons in various churches on the West Coast. In 1901 he left the pastorate of the Baptist church in Palo Alto, California to engage in independent work in San Francisco. From 1903 through 1908 he was pastor of the 23rd Avenue Baptist Church in Oakland, California. He was also editor of the journal Pacific Baptist. He served as pastor at the Los Gatos Baptist Church in the 1910s. In 1920 he and his family sailed to China to do missionary work.

== Activism and socialism ==
In 1906, Whitaker was accused of slander for charging Oakland City and Alameda County officials with corruption. Whitaker supported various progressive causes, like women's suffrage and the labor movement. In 1912, Whitaker ran as the Socialist candidate for California's 8th Congressional district. In 1917, Whitaker was charged with treason for agitating against the draft and conscription laws. He was jailed along with Reverend Floyd Hardin and Harold Storey, and spent three months in jail.

== Personal ==
In 1901 his first wife, Ellen ("Ellie"), died. In 1907 he married his second wife, Claire Wall. She outlived him.

== Works ==
=== Nonfiction ===
- Cupid and the Cloth [no date].
- Jesus Christ, the same yesterday and today and forever, 1885.
- Johnston of Stanford, 1919.
- One woman's worth: The story of Lucretia Watson Taylor, [1913].
- Sharing our Thanksgiving, 1918.
- Victory or Peace, 1918.
- Why callest thou me good?, 1913.
- The wickedness of doing nothing: an appeal for positive living, 1913.
- The yesterday and today of Socialism [no date].

=== Fiction ===
- A California girl: an idyl of married life [no date].
- The chamber of silence, 1903.
- Made to order, 1902.
- A mix-up of souls, 1907.
- Smith's Valley; Wanted an original deed; Two of a kind, 1900.
- A strong-minded woman, 1907.

=== Lectures and sermon outlines ===
- Lectures on Biblical Christology, 1901.
- Sermon outline - The city that would not [1909-1910].
- Sermon outline - How big is your God? [1909-1910].
- Sermon outline - The new birth [1909-1910].
- Sermon outline - And let him that heareth say come [1909-1910].
- Sermon outline - What does conversion mean to a modern man? [1909-1910].
- Sermon outline - Jesus and other masters [1909-1910].
- Sermon outline - Mohammed the prophet of Islam [1909-1910].
- Sermon outline - Confucius the Christ of China [1909-1910].
- Sermon outline - Jesus and Marcus Aurelius [1909-1910].
- Sermon outline - Jesus and Emerson [1909-1910].
- Sermon outline - What did Jesus mean by 'love your enemies' [1909-1910].
- Sermon outline - The contentiousness of the gospel [1909-1910].
- Sermon outline - The yea and the amen [1909-1910].
- Sermon outline - Vision and affirmation [1909-1910].
- Sermon outline - The inconveniences of omniscience [1909-1910].
- Sermon outline - The passing of old authority [1909-1910].
- Sermon outline - A working faith in man [1909-1910].
- Sermon outline - Some immediate ministries of this church [1909-1910].
- Sermon outline - Church troubles. Their causes and their cure [1909-1910].
- Sermon outline - The scorn of Jesus [1909-1910].
- Sermon outline - Common sense and foreign missions [1909-1910].
- Sermon outline - The humor of Jesus [1909-1910].
- Sermon outline - Can a man be saved who does not believe in Jesus Christ? [1909-1910].
- Sermon outline - Were there not ten cleansed? But where are the nine [1909-1910].
- Sermon outline - Ecclesiastes, the Hebrew Rubaiyat [1909-1910].
- Sermon outline - Modern aspects of evangelism [1909-1910].
- Sermon outline - The good and evil labor unions [1909-1910].
- Sermon outline - The resurrection [1909-1910].
- Sermon outline - Are there few that be saved [1909-1910].
- Sermon outline - Follow me [1909-1910].
- Sermon outline - What is true education [1909-1910].
- Sermon outline - The birth of Jesus [1909-1910].
- Sermon outline - What does patriotism mean to the average American [1909-1910].
- Sermon outline - A candid plea for prohibition [1909-1910].
- Sermon outlines for sermons preached during my first year at Los Gatos, California [1909-1910].
- Sermon outline - A church called Catholic [1909-1910].
- Sermon outline - The primary Protestant churches: Lutheran and Presbyterian [1909-1910].
- Sermon outline - The independent churches: Baptist, Congregational, and Quaker [1909-1910].
- Sermon outline - A study of Methodism [1909-1910].
- Sermon outline - The liberal churches: Universalist and Unitarian [1909-1910].
- Sermon outline - Affirmation the best negative [1909-1910].
- Sermon outline - What is the church good for [1909-1910].
- Sermon outline - Why I am a Baptist [1909-1910].
- Sermon outline - Mormonism [1909-1910].
- Sermon outline - Adventism, and the second coming of Christ [1909-1910].
- Sermon outline - Spiritualism: are the dead alive? [1909-1910].
- Sermon outline - Christian Science [1909-1910].
- Sermon outline - Objections stated [1909-1910].
- Sermon outline - Socialism [1909-1910].
- Sermon outline - The church outside the churches [1909-1910].
- Sermon outline - The church that is to be [1909-1910].
- Sermon outline - The parable of the mustard seed [1909-1910].
- Sermon outline - The parable of the tares [1909-1910].
- Sermon outline - The parable of the leaven [1909-1910].
- Sermon outline - The parable of the hidden [1909-1910].
- Sermon outline - The parable of the draw net [1909-1910].
- Sermon outline - The prosperity of real religion depends upon the prosperity of the Christian type of character [1909-1910].
- Sermon outline - The moral and spiritual development of the child [1909-1910].
- Sermon outline - A prisoner's Thanksgiving [1909-1910].
- Sermon outline - Can a Christian refuse to forgive? [1909-1910].
- Sermon outline - John Brown as a prophet of righteousness [1909-1910].
- Sermon outline - The disadvantages of wholesale murder: war and peace [1909-1910].

=== Poetry/verse ===
- Who weeps today, 1917.
- Prison verse, written during my days in jail in Los Angeles, 1919.
- Love's Credo, 1917.
- My country is the world; a selection of verse celebrating the higher patriotism, 1905.
- James Whitcomb Riley, 1916.
- A brother man, 1917.
- Whatever is, 1918.
- My country, 1905.
- God garners no green grain, 1902.
- Guilty, 1920.
- Two heroes: The burden, 1917.
- My country and other verse 1905.
