= Eric Hudson (cricketer) =

English cricketer and British Army officer (1900–1974)

Personal information
- Full name: Eric Vaughan Hamilton Hudson
- Born: 30 June 1900; Rajpur, Bengal Presidency, British India
- Died: 6 February 1974 (aged 73); Churston Ferrers, Devon, England
- Batting: Right-handed
- Bowling: Right-arm fast
- Relatives: Reginald Hudson (brother)

Domestic team information
- Years: Team
- 1933–1934: Hertfordshire

Career statistics
Competition	First-class
Matches	1
Runs scored	7
Batting average	3.50
100s/50s	–/–
Top score	7
Balls bowled	167
Wickets	4
Bowling average	21.50
5 wickets in innings	–
10 wickets in match	–
Best bowling	3/55
Catches/stumpings	–/–
- Source: Cricinfo, 7 July 2019

Eric Vaughan Hamilton Hudson (30 June 1900 – 6 February 1974) was an English first-class cricketer and British Army officer. Hudson served in the Middlesex Regiment from 1920–1934, before transferring to the Army Education Corps, with whom he served until his retirement in 1959. He also played first-class cricket for the British Army cricket team.

== Life and military career ==
Hudson was born at Rajpur in British India in June 1900. He was educated at Haileybury, before attending the Royal Military College, Sandhurst. He graduated from Sandhurst in December 1919, entering as a second lieutenant into the Middlesex Regiment. He was seconded for service with the Royal Air Force in November 1922, by which point he held the rank of lieutenant. He relinquished the rank of flying officer when he returned to duty with the Middlesex Regiment in November 1926. He made a single appearance in first-class cricket for the British Army cricket team against the Marylebone Cricket Club (MCC) at Lord's in 1930. Playing as a right-arm fast bowler, he took the wickets of Alfred Jeacocke, Tom Jameson and Bill Bowes in the MCC first-innings with figures of 3 for 55, while in their second-innings he took the wicket of Sid Pegler, taking figures of 1 for 31. With the bat, he was dismissed in the Army first-innings by Bowes for 7 runs, while in their second-innings he was dismissed by the same bowler without scoring. In the same year he was seconded as a supervising officer for physical training with the Eastern Command, a role he held until October 1933. He played minor counties cricket for Hertfordshire in 1933 and 1934, making nine appearances in the Minor Counties Championship.

He was seconded for service with the Army Education Corps (AEC) in May 1934, while in August 1934 he was promoted to the rank of captain. He was serving with the AEC in British India at the Indian Military Academy in April 1936, vacating this position in March 1939. He served in the Second World War with the AEC, and shortly after its conclusion he was promoted to the rank of major in February 1946. He was promoted to the rank of lieutenant colonel in September 1949, before promotion to the rank of colonel in June 1953. He retired from active service in July 1959. Husdon died in February 1974 at Churston Ferrers, Devon. His brother, Reginald Hudson, also played first-class cricket.
