= Peter Williams (Irish cricketer) =

Irish cricketer

Peter Victor Williams (10 July 1897 – 1 April 1971) was an Irish cricketer active from 1919 to 1927 who played for Sussex. He was born in Dublin and died in Auckland, New Zealand. He appeared in 23 first-class matches as a righthanded batsman who sometimes kept wicket. He scored 810 runs with a highest score of 146 and completed 13 catches with two stumpings.
