= Royal Military Academy Ground =

Cricket ground

Coordinates: 51.33776°N 0.76722°W

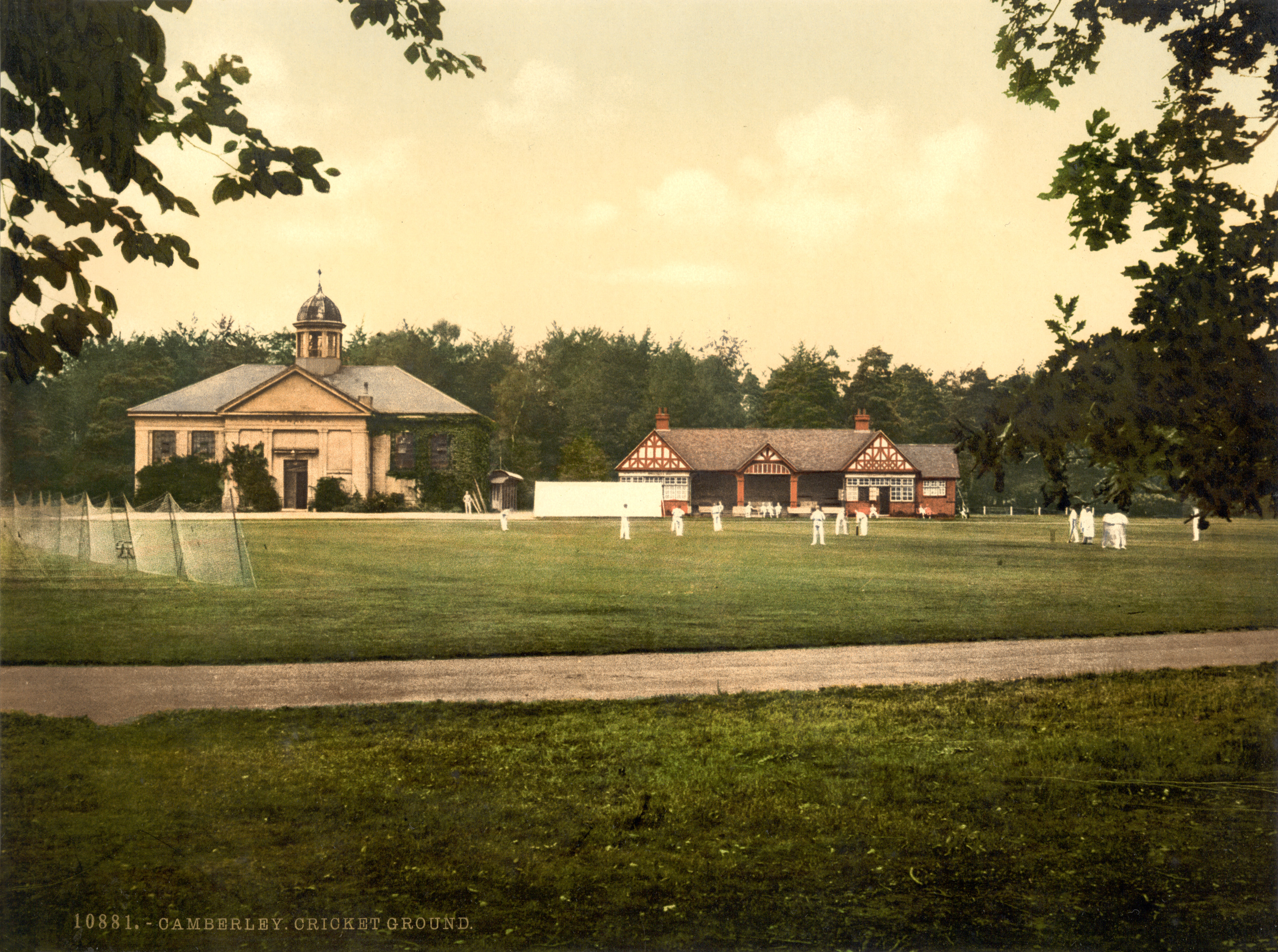

Ground information
- Location: Sandhurst, Berkshire, near Camberley, Surrey
- Establishment: 1893 (first recorded match)

Team information
| Army | (1938) |
- As of 28 August 2010; Source: Ground profile

Royal Military Academy Ground is a cricket ground in Sandhurst, Berkshire near Camberley, Surrey. The ground itself is located within the grounds of the Royal Military Academy at Sandhurst. The first recorded match on the ground was in 1893, when Royal Military Academy Sandhurst played Dr Nicholson's XI. In use constantly since 1893, it hosted its only first-class match in 1938, when the British Army played Oxford University. More recently, in 2006 the ground played host to a match between Officer Cadets of the Royal Military Academy and the Afghanistan national cricket team on their first tour to England.
