= Leo Williams (cricketer) =

English cricketer

Leoline ("Leo") Williams (15 May 1900 – 29 February 1984) DSO OBE was an English cricketer active from 1919 to 1931 who played for Sussex and Gloucestershire. He was born in Wotton-under-Edge, Gloucestershire and died in Lower Sticker, Cornwall. He appeared in 43 first-class matches as a righthanded batsman who sometimes kept wicket. He scored 1,440 runs with a highest score of 107 and completed 20 catches with five stumpings.
