= Michael Baines =

English cricketer and British Army officer

Personal information
- Full name: Michael Fitzroy Talbot Baines
- Born: 3 September 1898; Kasauli, Punjab Province, British India
- Died: 9 March 1990 (aged 91); South Newton, Wiltshire, England
- Batting: Unknown
- Bowling: Right-arm medium-fast
- Relatives: Threlfall Baines (cousin)

Career statistics
Competition	First-class
Matches	1
Runs scored	0
Batting average	0.00
100s/50s	–/–
Top score	0*
Balls bowled	48
Wickets	0
Bowling average	–
5 wickets in innings	–
10 wickets in match	–
Best bowling	–
Catches/stumpings	–/–
- Source: Cricinfo, 4 April 2019

Michael Fitzroy Talbot Baines OBE DL JP (3 September 1898 – 9 March 1990) was an English first-class cricketer and British Army officer. Graduating from the Royal Military Academy, Woolwich, Baines served in the Royal Artillery during the First World War. Alongside a military career that lasted for thirty years, he also played first-class cricket for the British Army cricket team, as well as serving as the deputy lieutenant for Bedfordshire. He was made an OBE in 1954 and was one of the oldest surviving first-class cricketers at the time of his death.

== Early life and First World War ==
The son of Major Edward Baines, he was born at Kasauli in British India, before being educated at Cheltenham College in England. From Cheltenhem he attended the Royal Military Academy, Woolwich, graduating in August 1916 and entering into the Royal Artillery as a second lieutenant. He served on the Western Front in the First World War, where he was initially posted to Rouen. He later served at Armentières, Ploegsteert Wood, and Passchendaele. During the course of the war, he was wounded by shrapnel, with his wound becoming infected and requiring treatment in the base hospital at Wimereux. In the later stages of the war he served at the Ypres Salient, before seeing action during the German spring offensive and at the Battle of Amiens. He contracted Spanish flu in 1918, which saw him hospitalised to Le Tréport. He was promoted to the rank of lieutenant in February 1918.

Following the Allied victory in November 1918, he was posted to Cologne in 1919 as part of the Army of Occupation, serving in Upper Silesia with the 65th Battery, 8th (Howitzer) Brigade in 1921–1922. During a peacekeeping patrol along the German–Polish frontier, he was shot at by a Polish sentry while attempting to cross a river, but was unharmed.

== Later military career and life ==
Eight years after the conclusion of the war, Baines made an appearance in first-class cricket for the British Army cricket team against Cambridge University at Fenner's. Batting twice in the match, he was dismissed without scoring in the Army's first-innings by Samuel Jagger, while in their second-innings he remained unbeaten without scoring.

He was seconded from the Royal Artillery to the Royal Militia of the Island of Jersey as an adjutant with the local rank of captain in May 1927. By 1929, he was serving as a temporary captain in the Territorial Army (TA), with restoration to the active list in March 1932. He attended a two-year course at the Staff College at Camberley in January 1933. He was then seconded for service on the staff in December 1936, serving in British India as a staff captain from 1 December 1936 to 25 April 1939.

He served with the Royal Artillery during the Second World War, retiring in May 1946, by which time the war was over, on account of disability, upon which he was granted the honorary rank of lieutenant colonel.

He was appointed as a justice of the peace for Bedfordshire in 1950, and was appointed an OBE in the 1954 Birthday Honours, having also served as a deputy lieutenant for Bedfordshire. He died in March 1990 at South Newton, Wiltshire. Prior to his death, he was one of the oldest surviving first-class cricketers. His cousin, Threlfall Baines, was also a first-class cricketer.
