= Kenelm McCloughin =

English cricketer and British Army officer

Personal information
- Full name: Kenelm Rees McCloughin
- Born: 18 August 1884; Bombay, Bombay Presidency, British India
- Died: 26 September 1915 (aged 31); Auchy-les-Mines, Pas-de-Calais, France
- Batting: Unknown
- Bowling: Unknown

Domestic team information
- Years: Team
- 1909/10: Europeans

Career statistics
Competition	First-class
Matches	5
Runs scored	158
Batting average	17.55
100s/50s	–/1
Top score	57
Balls bowled	102
Wickets	1
Bowling average	52.00
5 wickets in innings	–
10 wickets in match	–
Best bowling	1/4
Catches/stumpings	2/–
- Source: ESPNcricinfo, 14 April 2019

Kenelm Rees McCloughin (18 August 1884 – 26 September 1915) was an English first-class cricketer and British Army officer.

== Life and military career ==
McCloughin was born at Bombay in British India to Thomas John McCloughin and his wife, Mary Kathleen McCloughin. He was educated in England at Dulwich College, living with an aunt at Camberwell. From Dulwich he attended the Royal Military Academy, Woolwich, graduating into the Royal Garrison Artillery as a second lieutenant in December 1903. While in India he transferred to the British Indian Army, serving with the 14th King George's Own Ferozepore Sikhs. He was promoted to the rank of lieutenant in November 1908, with seniority to October 1905. While in India, he made his debut in first-class cricket for the Europeans against the Parsees at Poona in the 1909–10 Bombay Presidency Match. He was promoted to the rank of captain in December 1912.

While in England on leave in 1914, he made four appearances in first-class cricket, appearing twice for the Free Foresters against Oxford University and Cambridge University, as well as appearing once each for the British Army cricket team against Cambridge University, and for L. G. Robinson's XI against Oxford University. In five first-class matches, McCloughlin scored 158 runs at an average of 17.55. His highest score of 57 came for the Free Foresters against Cambridge University. He was still on leave in England when the First World War began in July, with McCloughlin transferring to the 11 Battalion, Royal Scots. He was promoted to the temporary rank of major in October 1914, before going to France in March 1915. While there he briefly served with the 15th Ludhiana Sikhs, before returning to the Royal Scots. He was killed in action at the Hohenzollern Redoubt during a German counter-attack on the second day of the Battle of Loos on 26 September 1915.
