= Gilbert Alexander =

South African cricketer

Gilbert William Arbuthnot Alexander (Umzinto 7 September 1895 – 10 April 1957, West Finchley, Middlesex, England) was a Scottish first class cricketer. He was the son of Major William Alexander and Ethel Rubina Arbuthnot.
