= Robert Whittaker (cricketer) =

English cricketer

Robert Christopher Cornwallis Whittaker (26 August 1908 – 11 February 1990) was an English cricketer active from 1927 to 1929 who played for Sussex. He was born in Melton, Suffolk and died in Fulham. He appeared in three first-class matches as a righthanded batsman who bowled left-arm orthodox spin. He scored 31 runs with a highest score of 31 and took six wickets with a best performance of five for 36.
