= Robert H. Whittaker (politician) =

American politician

Robert H. Whittaker or Robert H. Whitaker (died September 7, 1905) was a member of the Virginia House of Delegates in the U.S. state of Virginia, from 1874 - 1877.

== Biography ==
Whittaker was born enslaved sometime between 1830 and 1845 based on the 1870 and 1900 census recorded ages and was probably a native of Brunswick County.

He was elected justice of the peace of the Totaro Magisterial District in May 1871.

He was selected by the Brunswick County Republican party to be the nominee for the Virginia House of Delegates in August 1873. The newspapers described him as a Radical Republican while he was campaigning. Whittaker was duly elected to the House of Delegates in November 1873 defeating by 1448 to 961 the white conservative candidate. He was thus elected to serve in the 1874 general assembly representing Brunswick County as a Republican. Thomas E. Chambliss contested the seat on the basis that Whittaker was "ignorant and incapable of performing the duties", sources described Chambliss as a "chronic campaigner" and no official receipt of a challenge has been found to be recorded.

During this first session Whittaker served as a low ranking seat on the low importance Committee on Public Property. In August 1875 he attended a state convention to "discuss the economic inequalities faced by African Americans in Virginia".

Whittaker was re-elected in November 1875 again beating the white conservative opponent by a strong margin of 1227 to 827. He was again nominated to run for a third term in October 1877 but he did not run.

In 1881 he went to a Convention of African American Republicans in Petersburg.

Around 1884 he married a Minerva Ann of unknown maiden name (which may have been his second marriage) and together they had a child that did not live into adulthood.

Whittaker won the first of his three two year terms to the office of Brunswick County Board of Supervisors from Totaro Magisterial District in May 1887. Towards the end of his service he was in serious financial issues that resulted in the courts ordering that his land be sold at a public auction to pay his debts around 1902.

He died September 7, 1905 described as about seventy.

== See also ==
- African American officeholders from the end of the Civil War until before 1900
