= 1947 County Championship =

English cricket tournament

- Cricket format: First-class cricket (3 days)
- Tournament format: League system
- Matches: 221
- Most runs: Bill Edrich, Middlesex; 2,257
- Most wickets: Tom Goddard, Gloucestershire; 206

The 1947 County Championship was the 48th officially organised running of the County Championship. Middlesex, under the captaincy of Walter Robins, won the trophy for the fourth time in their history.

== Season review ==
Robins was well supported by slow left-arm spinner Jack Young, who took 159 wickets in all matches; off break bowler Jim Sims; pace bowler Laurie Gray; wicketkeeper Leslie Compton; and their quartet of high-scoring batsmen Denis Compton, Bill Edrich, Syd Brown and Jack Robertson. The Wisden editorial drew attention to an additional feat by Middlesex in defeating "The Rest" by nine wickets in the last match of the season at The Oval. Previously, only Yorkshire (1905 and 1935) had beaten The Rest, the fixture having lapsed from 1936 to 1946. Yorkshire had won the County Championship in 1946 but slipped to seventh place in 1947 and Wisden remarked on the retirement of "several veterans" after the 1946 season, although the highest innings score of the 1947 season, 270 not out, was achieved by Yorkshire's Len Hutton.

Playfair described the championship as "a great tussle" between Middlesex and Gloucestershire that was not settled until 28 August when Middlesex won their penultimate match, defeating bottom team Northamptonshire at Lord's by 355 runs. The key match, however, took place earlier in the month when Middlesex defeated Gloucestershire at Cheltenham by 68 runs. Middlesex had finished runners-up five times in succession: 1936 to 1939 and again in 1946. Since Middlesex's previous title in 1921, no southern team had won the championship and so their 1947 triumph ended 25 seasons of northern domination.

=== Gloucestershire v Middlesex, August 1947 ===
The Gloucestershire v Middlesex match at the College Ground, Cheltenham was the ultimate decider of a close-fought championship. It began on Saturday, 16 August on the same day as the fifth Test at The Oval and Playfair remarked that "even the final Test seemed a matter of secondary importance". There was no play on Sundays in 1947 and the match continued into Monday, 18 August, when it was concluded with Tuesday to spare. Middlesex were without Compton and Robertson who were both playing for England but they did have Edrich, rested by England.

Middlesex won the toss and decided to bat, Brown and Edrich opening with a stand of 50 before Brown was out lbw to the seamer Colin Scott. Edrich went on to score 50 but, apart from some resistance by tailenders Sims and Young, Middlesex's batting collapsed as Gloucestershire's great off spinner Tom Goddard took seven for 70. Middlesex were all out for 180 but Sims (six for 65) and Young (four for 55) turned the tables and bowled out Gloucestershire for 153. At close of play on Saturday, Middlesex had reached 9 for 1 in their second innings, Goddard having taken the key wicket of Edrich, so Monday's play began with Middlesex ahead by 36 and nine wickets standing. The decisive phase of the match was a third wicket partnership on Monday morning between Harry Sharp and the captain Robins. Scoring 46 and 45 respectively, they shared a stand of 70 runs which Playfair described as "vital". Otherwise, Middlesex again collapsed and Goddard took eight for 86 to complete an outstanding match analysis of fifteen for 156. So Gloucestershire with a day and a half remaining needed 169 to win. Jack Crapp tried to hold the innings together and scored 40 but Gloucestershire were rolled over for only 100 to lose by 68 runs. Young took five for 27 but an important role was again played by Sharp, this time as an off spinner, taking the wickets of three of Gloucestershire's top six batsmen, two of them without scoring. Playfair points out that Sharp at the time was still only a member of the Lord's ground staff but he played the key part in winning the match that ultimately settled the championship.

=== Season finale ===
Gloucestershire had gone into the Cheltenham match with a lead of four points in the championship table and the immediate outcome was that Middlesex overtook them to lead by eight points, both teams having four matches still to be played. Middlesex had to play Derbyshire away, "always difficult to beat", and three home matches against Surrey, Northamptonshire and third-placed Lancashire whom Playfair termed "the toughest nut to crack". Playfair considered Gloucestershire's programme to be easier as they faced four moderate teams: Glamorgan at Cheltenham, Hampshire and Sussex away, and Essex at Bristol.

There was no change after the first two matches as Gloucestershire beat Glamorgan in two days and Middlesex won the difficult encounter at Derby. It all went wrong for Gloucestershire at Dean Park, Bournemouth where stubborn Hampshire batting forced a draw while Middlesex were defeating Surrey with some ease. This gave Middlesex a twenty-point lead and only two matches each to be played. Middlesex's victory over the bottom team Northants settled it, especially as Gloucestershire surprisingly lost to Sussex by nine wickets. Even so, there was a slight sting in the tail as Middlesex then lost their final match to a determined Lancashire by 64 runs while Gloucestershire rallied to defeat Essex. The final table showed Middlesex winning by twenty points, on the face of it a handsome margin, but in reality it was a much closer contest than the figures would suggest.

=== Final table ===
The seventeen first-class county teams played a total of 26 matches each. Twelve points were awarded for a win and six to each team if the result was a tie, as happened twice in 1947. Teams leading on first innings who subsequently drew or lost the match were awarded four points. Essex were awarded two points in one match they lost after a tie on first innings.

The final championship table was as follows:

	Team	P	W	L	D	T	No dec	1st Inns Lead	1st Inns Tie	Pts
1	Middlesex	26	19	5	2	0	0	2	0	236
2	Gloucestershire	26	17	4	5	0	0	3	0	216
3	Lancashire	26	13	1	10	1	1	6	0	186
4	Kent	26	12	8	6	0	0	7	0	172
5	Derbyshire	26	11	9	5	0	1	7	0	160
6	Surrey	26	10	7	8	0	1	5	0	140
=7	Worcestershire	26	7	11	8	0	0	9	0	120
=7	Yorkshire	26	8	7	10	0	1	6	0	120
=9	Glamorgan	26	8	8	8	0	2	5	0	116
=9	Sussex	26	9	12	5	0	0	2	0	116
=11	Essex	26	6	9	10	1	0	5	1	100
=11	Nottinghamshire	26	6	6	13	0	1	7	0	100
=11	Somerset	26	8	12	6	0	0	1	0	100
14	Leicestershire	26	6	14	5	0	1	5	0	92
15	Warwickshire	26	6	12	7	0	1	3	0	84
16	Hampshire	26	4	11	8	1	2	6	0	78
17	Northamptonshire	26	2	16	6	1	1	6	0	54

=== Tied matches ===
Tied matches are a rarity in cricket and there had been only two County Championship ties in the previous 21 years. Essex and Somerset had tied in 1926, then Worcestershire and Somerset in 1939. In 1947, there were two tied matches: Essex v Northamptonshire and Hampshire v Lancashire. Playfair noted that these were the 20th and 21st tied matches in the history of first-class cricket worldwide since the earliest known instance in 1783.

The Essex v Northamptonshire match was played at Valentines Park, Ilford 17 to 20 May. Northamptonshire won the toss and decided to bat, scoring 215 all out with a top score of 49 by Vince Broderick while Essex's Test leg break and googly bowler Peter Smith took four for 65. By close of play on Saturday, Essex had replied to 170 for 4 with opener Chick Cray on 90 not out. He completed his century, exactly 100, on Monday morning and Essex went on to total 267 all out. Northamptonshire were 219 for 5 at the close on Monday evening with their veteran batsman John Timms on 90 not out. Timms was out for 112 on Tuesday morning and Peter Smith completed ten in the match by taking six for 84 in the Northamptonshire total of 291. Essex therefore needed 240 to win with ample time left on the final day. They had a good stand of 103 for the fourth wicket between Frank Vigar (60) and Len Clark (64) but spinners Broderick and Bertie Clarke kept picking up the wickets and Essex were still ten behind when the ninth went down. The last pair were captain Tom Pearce and wicketkeeper Tom Wade who managed to level the scores before Wade was bowled by Clarke to tie the match.

Hampshire v Lancashire was played at Dean Park, Bournemouth on 27 to 29 August. Hampshire batted first and scored 363, the innings continuing into the Thursday morning, Jim Bailey with 95 the top scorer. Lancashire captain Ken Cranston had taken four for 73 and he led the Lancashire reply with 155 not out before declaring the innings closed at 367 for 9. Hampshire safely negotiated the last few overs on Thursday evening to close on 18 for 0 before totalling 224 for 7 declared on Friday, Jim Bailey again the top scorer with 63. This was a sporting declaration by the Hampshire captain Desmond Eagar as there was time to bowl only 47 overs before the close. Cyril Washbrook led the chase with 105 while Jim Bailey, having twice starred with the bat, took six for 82. When the last over began, Lancashire had reached 220 for 8 with Jack Ikin and wicketkeeper Alfred Barlow batting, but this was the last wicket as William Roberts had been taken to hospital with a broken finger and could not bat. Ikin and Barlow came together at 204 for 8 and so had added 16 for the final wicket to level the scores. Barlow was on strike and facing off spinner Gerry Hill. The first three balls produced no run and then Barlow was run out as he tried for a quick single to end the match in a tie.

=== Middlesex ===
As Playfair put it, "few will dispute that the best team won the championship". Middlesex's first four batsmen — Robertson, Brown, Edrich and Compton — scored between them 12,193 runs in all first-class matches, a level of success unprecedented in county cricket. The other batting positions were contested by George Mann, who was heir-apparent to Robins as club captain and succeeded him in 1948; Alan Fairbairn, a 1947 debutant who scored centuries in each of his first two county matches; Harry Sharp and Alec Thompson. The three main bowlers were Gray, Young and the veteran Sims. Ian Bedford, aged seventeen, made his debut and took twelve wickets in his first two matches. Middlesex also made effective use as bowlers of Robins, Edrich and Denis Compton. Playfair noted the consistently high standard of the Middlesex fielding, especially by Brown, while Leslie Compton as wicket-keeper was a great success. Middlesex made exclusive use of Lord's Cricket Ground in St John's Wood, north London, for their thirteen home matches.

=== Gloucestershire ===
Gloucestershire's strong challenge for the title was despite the loss of Wally Hammond but in Tom Goddard they had the best bowler in the country. He took 238 wickets in all matches, 61 more than his nearest rival. He was well supported by Sam Cook who took 120 championship wickets and gained a Test call, but the team lacked quality pace bowlers with George Lambert largely on his own apart from the medium pace of Test batsman Charlie Barnett. Five Gloucestershire batsmen scored over 1,000 runs in the championship: captain Basil Allen, Barnett, Jack Crapp, George Emmett and wicket-keeper Andy Wilson. Playfair recorded concerns about the pitch at Bristol which was alleged by some to have been prepared especially for Goddard. It is true that Gloucestershire won eight of the nine matches played there but equally true that Goddard took most of his wickets in matches not at Bristol. Ken Graveney made his debut for Gloucestershire in 1947 and his brother Tom was waiting in the wings. Other players included Monty Cranfield, Bev Lyon, Clifford Monks, William Neale, Grahame Parker, Colin Scott and Alfred Wilcox.

Gloucestershire generally used their headquarters in Bristol, playing nine of their fourteen home matches there. All the venues were:

- Ashley Down Ground, Bristol
- College Ground, Cheltenham
- Wagon Works Ground, Gloucester

=== Lancashire ===
Lancashire finished third for the second season in succession. They lost only once (to Somerset) but drew ten and tied one. They were well served by their openers Cyril Washbrook and Winston Place who both scored more than 2,000 runs in all first-class matches, Washbrook playing in all five Tests and Place being selected for the West Indies tour. There were problems in the middle order where only Geoff Edrich performed consistently well, but the two Test all-rounders, Jack Ikin and captain Ken Cranston scored over 1,000 runs. Lancashire's outstanding bowler was paceman Dick Pollard who finished the season strongly after an indifferent early phase and took 144 wickets in all matches. Slow left armer William Roberts bowled steadily and took 74 championship wickets but Playfair remarked that he was short of Test class. As with the batting, the all-rounders Cranston and Ikin shored up the bowling with 56 and 48 championship wickets respectively. Looking to the future, Lancashire made a "find" in wicketkeeper Alfred Barlow and there were good reports of Alan Wharton who became a Lancashire stalwart for many seasons. Batsman Barry Howard played some good innings in his debut season and, along with Cranston, was awarded his county cap. Other players included future county captain Nigel Howard, Tom Brierley, Phil King in his final season, future Test umpire Eddie Phillipson, Eric Price, and Gordon Garlick who joined Northamptonshire in 1948.

Lancashire played the majority of their home matches at their Old Trafford headquarters and played two matches elsewhere in the county:

- Aigburth Cricket Ground, Liverpool
- Old Trafford Cricket Ground, Manchester
- Stanley Park, Blackpool

=== Kent ===
Kent improved from seventh to fourth and were able to announce increased attendances and membership. The team was again captained by Bryan Valentine and featured England stars Godfrey Evans and Doug Wright, though they missed several championship matches for Test calls. Kent were particularly well served by their batsmen, although Valentine had problems with loss of form at times. Les Ames, Les Todd and Arthur Fagg all scored more than 2,000 runs in the season. The young left-hander Peter Hearn was regarded as a fine prospect and was awarded his county cap. Wright was the main bowler and was supported by off spinner Ray Dovey, all-rounder Jack Davies and the two pacemen Fred Ridgway and Norman Harding. Harding died unexpectedly in September, aged 31. Other players included Geoffrey Anson, Brian Edrich, the veteran Hopper Levett in his final season, Tony Mallett, future captain Bill Murray-Wood and Tony Pawson. A curious case was pace bowler Jack Martin, who played for Kent only twice in 1947 and yet was selected to play for England in the Trent Bridge Test.

Kent's policy was to play home matches throughout the county and they used seven venues:

- Bat and Ball Ground, Gravesend
- Crabble Athletic Ground, Dover
- Garrison Ground 2, Gillingham
- Mote Park, Maidstone
- St Lawrence Ground, Canterbury
- Nevill Ground, Royal Tunbridge Wells
- Rectory Field, Blackheath

=== Derbyshire ===
Derbyshire was the most improved team of the year, rising ten places from fifteenth in 1946 to fifth in 1947. They were a strong bowling team with pacemen Bill Copson, Cliff Gladwin and George Pope all playing for England. Dusty Rhodes, bowling mainly leg break, and left-armer Eric Marsh provided support. Derbyshire, captained for the first time by Edward Gothard, played attacking cricket and were involved in several close finishes. The batting was weakened by injuries to Stan Worthington, in his final season, and Denis Smith. Charlie Elliott and Arnold Townsend topped 1,000 runs but Playfair noted that the presence of one really top-class batsman would have made an enormous difference to Derbyshire's batting. John Eggar, who topped the county averages, might have filled that gap but his teaching career enabled him to play only in August. Smith was seconded to keep wicket for most of the season until George Dawkes, formerly of Leicestershire, was able to join the team. Dawkes went on to become one of the greatest English wicketkeepers. Another notable debutant was fast bowler Les Jackson. Other players included Albert Alderman, 55-year-old Harry Elliott in his final season, Alan Revill and Pat Vaulkhard.

Most of Derbyshire's home matches were played at one of their two main venues in Derby and Chesterfield but they occasionally played elsewhere. The five venues used were:

- County Ground, Derby
- Queen's Park, Chesterfield
- Abbeydale Park, Dore
- Rutland Recreation Ground, Ilkeston
- Park Road, Buxton

=== Surrey ===
Surrey showed improvements on 1946 but Playfair remarked on "the need for new blood". Having said that, the arrival of Jim Laker certainly resolved any problems in spin bowling and his future partner Tony Lock was already making progress at second eleven level. Another good start was made by opening batsman David Fletcher who was awarded his county cap with Laker and Eric Bedser. Six Surrey batsmen topped 1,000 runs in the championship: Eric Bedser, Fletcher, captain Errol Holmes, Tom Barling, John Parker and Stan Squires. Laurie Fishlock had a chequered season having been dogged by serious illness since he went to Australia with England in the winter. Wicketkeeper Arthur McIntyre played well and produced some good batting performances. The main bowlers were Alec Bedser, Jim Laker and the retiring Alf Gover, who took 121 wickets in his final season. Seamer Eddie Watts could make only a few appearances due to injury. Geoffrey Whittaker made eight appearances and two future Surrey mainstays Bernie Constable and Stuart Surridge also played.

Surrey played twelve of their thirteen home matches at The Oval and one in Guildford. Two first-class matches not involving the Surrey XI were played in Kingston-upon-Thames. All venues:

- The Oval, Kennington, south London
- Woodbridge Road, Guildford
- Leyland Motors Ground, Kingston-upon-Thames

=== Worcestershire ===
Following the emigration of Sandy Singleton to Rhodesia after the 1946 season, Allan White succeeded him as Worcestershire captain. The team lacked batting strength and did well to improve their championship position. The outstanding player was Test all-rounder Dick Howorth who was, as in 1946, the first player to complete the double of 1,000 runs and 100 wickets. Howorth was a slow left arm spinner and formed a successful partnership with Peter Jackson who bowled mostly off breaks. Howorth took 164 wickets in all matches and Jackson 125. Future England player Roly Jenkins made a telling contribution (67 wickets) with his leg breaks and googlies while paceman Reg Perks took 123 wickets in all matches. The success of the bowlers owed much to keeper Hugo Yarnold who claimed the most victims in the championship. Howorth, Jenkins, Eddie Cooper and, in his first full season, Don Kenyon all exceeded 1,000 runs. Worcestershire's best known batsmen at the time were Charles Palmer and the veteran Bob Wyatt and they were the first two in the county averages but neither played a full season. Laddie Outschoorn qualified for the championship for the first time and showed promise. Other players included Ronald Bird, Fred Cooper (brother of Eddie), Norman Whiting and Martin Young.

Worcestershire played nine of their thirteen home matches at their County Ground headquarters in Worcester and used five venues in all:

- Chester Road North Ground, Kidderminster
- New Road, Worcester
- Tipton Road, Dudley
- War Memorial Ground, Amblecote
- Racecourse Ground, Hereford

=== Yorkshire ===
Yorkshire fell from champions to seventh and used 25 different players in the championship alone. There was future promise in five new caps: wicketkeeper Don Brennan, batsmen Willie Watson and Gerald Smithson, fast bowler Alec Coxon and left arm spinner Johnny Wardle. In addition, future stalwart Ted Lester began his career with three successive centuries and topped the county averages. Future captain Vic Wilson made a few appearances. Brian Sellers captained the team for the final time before handing over to Norman Yardley for the 1948 season. Bill Bowes in his final season topped the bowling averages and received a record benefit. He was supported by Wardle, off spinner Ellis Robinson, seamer Frank Smailes and new pace bowlers Coxon and Ron Aspinall. Yorkshire were hit by the loss through illness, after only four matches, of slow left armer Arthur Booth, who had been their outstanding player in 1946. The batting was generally not up to scratch and relied far too much on one man, the great Len Hutton who, because of Test calls, played in only half of Yorkshire's championship matches. Other players included Harry Crick, Harry Halliday, Freddie Jakeman, Geoffrey Keighley and pace bowler John Whitehead.

Yorkshire used seven venues in various parts of the county:

- Bramall Lane, Sheffield
- Fartown Ground, Huddersfield
- Headingley Cricket Ground, Leeds
- North Marine Road Ground, Scarborough
- Park Avenue, Bradford
- St George's Road Cricket Ground, Harrogate
- The Circle, Kingston upon Hull

=== Glamorgan ===
Glamorgan never had a settled team and there were a number of new arrivals at the end of the season including Gilbert Parkhouse, Jim Eaglestone, Norman Hever and Phil Clift. This might suggest a club in transition but there were grounds for optimism which were realised in 1948 when the club won its first championship. Glamorgan's bowling in 1947 suffered an early blow when their only real pace bowler Peter Judge was ruled out for the season after being injured in only the second match. Dynamic captain Wilf Wooller had to carry the seam attack almost single-handedly and took 85 wickets in addition to scoring 1,270 runs. Glamorgan relied mostly on spin with Len Muncer and the veteran Johnnie Clay bowling off breaks and opening batsman Emrys Davies helping out with his slow left. Davies created a county record by scoring five centuries in the season and formed an effective opening partnership with Arnold Dyson, both of them scoring more than 1,500 runs in the championship. Future Test player Allan Watkins exceeded 1,000 runs and there were some good innings by Wat Jones and George Lavis. The main wicketkeeper was Haydn Davies who claimed 47 victims in the championship but had some problems with a damaged hand. Other players included veteran Austin Matthews in his final season, Jim Pleass, Arthur Porter and Maurice Robinson.

Most of Glamorgan' home matches were played at one of their two main venues in Cardiff and Swansea but they occasionally played elsewhere. The four venues used were:

- Cardiff Arms Park, Cardiff
- Eugene Cross Park, Ebbw Vale
- Rodney Parade, Newport
- St Helen's Cricket Ground, Swansea

=== Sussex ===
Playfair emphasised the contrast between strong batting and weak bowling at Sussex who recovered from bottom place in 1946 to finish a creditable equal ninth. Only Jim Cornford performed consistently well among the bowlers while six batsmen scored over 1,000 runs. Three of these exceeded 2,000 in all matches: John Langridge, George Cox and Harry Parks. James Langridge reached the thousand despite missing several matches due to appendicitis. Charles Oakes and new captain Hugh Bartlett were the other two. His predecessor turned club secretary Billy Griffith had a poor season with the bat but kept wicket well enough to be selected for England's winter tour. Other players who appeared were Paul Carey, Donald Smith, Jim Wood, Jack Oakes, John Nye and two future Test players Alan Oakman and David Sheppard.

Sussex generally played home matches at their County Ground headquarters in Hove and used five venues in all:

- Central Recreation Ground, Hastings
- Priory Park, Chichester
- County Cricket Ground, Hove
- Cricketfield Road Ground, Horsham
- The Saffrons, Eastbourne

=== Essex ===
Essex matches were noted for high scores as Essex themselves scored more runs than anyone except Middlesex but also conceded the most. Their two outstanding players were the cousins Peter and Ray Smith who both completed the double. These two, bowling leg break and off break respectively, effectively carried the Essex attack. Outstanding prospect Trevor Bailey was the sole pace bowler of any effect but he was only available in the latter half of the season and then injuries limited his bowling, though he topped the county's batting averages. The other all-rounder Frank Vigar took 59 championship wickets bowling leg breaks but was expensive. Bailey, Vigar and the Smiths were half of the eight Essex players who scored 1,000 runs in the season, the other four being captain Tom Pearce, Chick Cray, Dickie Dodds and Doug Insole. Wicketkeeper Tom Wade had a very good season with 77 victims, 38 of them stumped. Essex were also represented by Bill Dines, Bill Morris, Denys Wilcox, Dick Horsfall, Frank Rist, Harry Crabtree, Len Clark and Sonny Avery.

Essex continued their policy of playing matches throughout the county and home venues used in 1947 were:

- Castle Park Cricket Ground, Colchester
- Chalkwell Park, Westcliff-on-Sea
- County Ground, Chelmsford
- Old County Ground, Brentwood
- Southchurch Park, Southend-on-Sea
- Valentine's Park, Ilford
- Vista Road Recreation Ground, Clacton-on-Sea

=== Nottinghamshire ===
Nottinghamshire, captained for the first time by William Sime, drew half of their matches and only the top three had less defeats. They lost Bill Voce early in the season to retirement and this placed a heavy burden on the remaining pace bowlers Arthur Jepson and Harold Butler. They did well, both taking over 100 wickets and Butler being picked for England, but they lacked support. The only other bowler to make any kind of impression was slow left armer Harry Winrow who took 56 championship wickets. Winrow was one of five batsmen to score 1,000 runs. The best of these by a distance was England's Joe Hardstaff junior who had an outstanding season, scoring 2,396 with seven centuries. Walter Keeton, Reg Simpson and Tom Reddick all topped 1,000 runs while Charles Harris was approaching the landmark when his season was ended early by illness. Wicketkeeper Eric Meads claimed 52 victims in championship matches. Cambridge University captain Guy Willatt batted well when available and young Peter Harvey, leg break and googly bowler, looked a good prospect, but Freddie Stocks did not fulfil the promise he showed in 1946. Nottinghamshire made exclusive use of their headquarters at Trent Bridge in Nottingham for their thirteen home matches.

=== Somerset ===
Somerset were captained for the only time by educator Jack Meyer but the team did not learn anything and dropped seven places from fourth in 1946 to equal eleventh. Even so, they pulled off some surprises by defeating champions Middlesex twice and inflicting on third-placed Lancashire their only loss of the season. Somerset were let down by their batting with only Harold Gimblett reliable through the season. Michael Walford played very well in the closing weeks when he became available and Playfair called him "the best amateur batsman in England on a firm wicket". The main bowler was veteran Arthur Wellard who was supported by all-rounders Bertie Buse and Johnny Lawrence, slow left armer Horace Hazell, captain Meyer and new pace bowler Maurice Tremlett. The veteran Wally Luckes kept wicket and claimed 55 championship victims. Other players were Bill Andrews in his final season, Frank Lee in his final season before becoming an umpire, Hugh Watts, George Woodhouse, Mandy Mitchell-Innes and Miles Coope.

Somerset generally played home matches at their County Ground headquarters in Taunton and used five venues in all:

- Agricultural Showgrounds, Frome
- Clarence Park, Weston-super-Mare
- County Ground, Taunton
- Recreation Ground, Bath
- Rowdens Road, Wells

=== Leicestershire ===
Leicestershire had fourteen defeats and finished fourteenth. In Les Berry, they had the only professional captain in the County Championship. In July, they were involved in two exciting finishes, first when Middlesex were set to score 66 in 25 minutes and got them, courtesy of Edrich and Compton, to win by ten wickets with only four minutes to spare. Second, in their home match against Derbyshire, Leicestershire themselves succeeded in a run chase scoring 391 to win by three wickets at over eighty runs an hour, the winning run coming from a straight six off the third ball of the final over. Leicestershire were a strong batting team with Berry, Vic Jackson, Gerry Lester, Francis Prentice, Maurice Tompkin and George Watson all exceeding 1,000 runs while all-rounder Anthony Riddington scored over 800. Wicketkeeper Percy Corrall claimed 59 victims in championship matches. The main bowler was Jack Walsh, a great exponent of slow left-arm wrist-spin, who took 152 wickets in all matches. Jackson and the veteran James Sperry bowled well but Leicestershire's main need was a good pace bowler. Other players were Thomas Chapman, Jack Howard and Harry Pickering.

Leicestershire played the majority of their home matches at their Grace Road headquarters in Leicester and used four venues in all:

- Egerton Park, Melton Mowbray
- Grace Road, Leicester
- Kirkby Road, Barwell
- Park Road, Loughborough

=== Warwickshire ===
Warwickshire, let down by unreliable batting, were captained by attacking batsman Peter Cranmer. Despite their lack of success, they attracted large crowds to Edgbaston. Their best players were Test spinner Eric Hollies and batsman Tom Dollery, who was to become captain as a professional in 1948, though Dollery had a relatively poor season in 1947. Warwickshire were well served by their bowlers. In addition to Hollies, these were three new caps in the two seamers Victor Cannings and Charles Grove; and the New Zealand pace bowler Tom Pritchard. Dollery had to play as wicketkeeper in several matches when Cyril Goodway was unavailable. Playfair commented on advantages gained by the bowlers being "squandered" by inconsistent and unreliable batsmen. Five batsmen did exceed 1,000 runs but none had a good average: Cranmer, Dollery, Aubrey Hill, Jimmy Ord and Ken Taylor. Other players were Bill Fantham, John Hossell and Ron Maudsley. Warwickshire played eleven home matches at their Edgbaston headquarters in Birmingham and two matches at the Courtaulds Ground in Coventry.

=== Hampshire ===
Hampshire, a very ordinary team who bowled badly, were captained by Desmond Eagar. The batting was occasionally good and top of the county's averages was wicketkeeper Neil McCorkell who scored 1,539 championship runs and claimed 49 victims. Neville Rogers and Johnny Arnold played some good innings to both comfortably exceed 1,000 runs. Eagar and Gerry Hill both reached 1,000 with low averages and the all-rounder Jim Bailey, who took 53 wickets, fell just short of 1,000 runs. Playfair considered "the steady and loyal George Heath" to be the best of the bowlers who included Bailey, Hill, Victor Ransom, Lofty Herman and the injury-plagued Charles Knott. Other players included Gilbert Dawson, Thomas Dean, Arthur Holt, Alan Shirreff and future stalwart Leo Harrison.

Hampshire's home matches were shared between three venues:

- County Ground, Southampton
- Dean Park Cricket Ground, Bournemouth
- United Services Recreation Ground, Portsmouth

=== Northamptonshire ===
Northamptonshire slipped from sixteenth to bottom and were captained by Arthur Childs-Clarke. Dennis Brookes was the pick of the batsmen and earned a trip to the West Indies in the winter. Bill Barron, Percy Davis and John Timms also topped 1,000 runs but with low averages. Vince Broderick put in a sound all-round effort with 860 runs and 87 wickets while the best bowler was West Indian Test player Bertie Clarke with 89 wickets. The attack was hampered by injuries to Nobby Clark who did not play often. Wicketkeeper Kenneth Fiddling claimed 40 victims. Other players included Leo Bennett, Robert Clarke, Arthur Cox, Eddie Davis, William Nevell and Jack Webster.

Northamptonshire played nine of their thirteen home matches at their County Ground headquarters in Northampton and used five venues in all:

- County Cricket Ground, Northampton
- Town Ground, Kettering
- Town Ground, Peterborough
- Town Ground, Rushden
- Wellingborough School Ground, Wellingborough
