= Alfred Barlow =

Alfred Barlow may refer to:

- Alfred Barlow (cricketer)
- Alfred Barlow (American football)
