= Wilf Jones =

Welsh cricketer

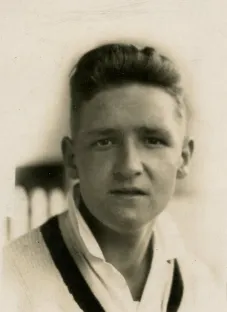

Personal information
- Full name: Wilfred Edward Jones
- Born: 2 February 1912; Pontardawe, Wales
- Died: October, 1992; Ogmore River, Wales (aged 80)
- Batting: Left-handed
- Bowling: Slow left-arm orthodox spin
- Role: Batsman
- Relatives: Annie Turner (spouse), Hilary Jones (daughter) Watkin Jones (father) Cecilia Hale (mother)

International information
- National side: Wales

Wilfred Edward Jones (2 February 1912 – October 1992) was a Welsh cricketer active from 1929 to 1933 who played for Glamorgan. He was born in Pontardawe and died in Ogwr. He appeared in 50 first-class matches as a left-handed batsman who bowled slow left arm orthodox spin. He scored 300 runs with the highest score of 27 and took 77 wickets with a best performance of six for 93.

== Early life ==
Born on 2 February 1912 to Watkin Jones and Cecelia Hale in Pontardawe, Wilf was born to a large family which included several brothers and sisters, it's unsure when he had taken an interest in cricket but it's known that after some impressive performances for Pontardawe CC during the early years of the South Wales and Monmouthshire League he joined Glamorgan’s junior staff as Frank Ryan's understudy. Wilf made his first-class debut against the 1929 Springboks at Pontypridd, and two years later took 6/93 against the New Zealanders at the Cardiff Arms Park.

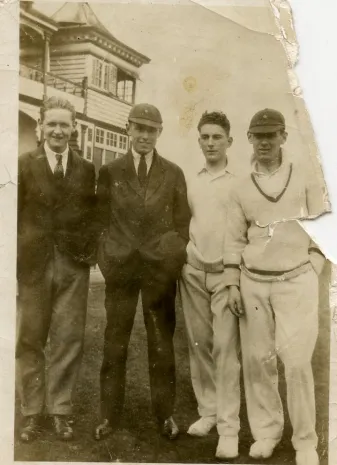
Wilf Jones, left, seen at Cardiff Arms Park in 1929 with fellow professionals Arnold Dyson, Alan Howard, and George Lavis. Photo Credit – Neil ap Jones.

== Biography ==
Wilfred and Leslie Nash (a member of the ground staff at Cardiff's Arms Park ) appeared on remand to answer several summonses for alleged motor offenses. Nash and Jones were summoned jointly and separately with driving away a motor car without the owner's consent, while Nash was further summoned for driving dangerously, driving without care and attention, failing to stop after an accident, having no license, and having no third-party insurance. Jones was summoned for aiding in respect of the whole of these alleged offenses. Mr. Leslie Dacey, prosecuting, said when persons went for a 'joy ride' and there was an accident, the passengers and the driver were liable. It was alleged that the car was taken by Nash and Jones from the Cardiff Arms Park on the occasion of the Glamorgan and Warwickshire match on 12 July. It was found out that the car had belonged to the famed cricketer and professional footballer, Fanny Walden. It has been stated by the Jones family that Wilf had lost his confidence after the incident, subsequently resulting in him being released in 1933. It’s been said by the grandson of Wilfred that he could, “see the sensitivity in his face.”

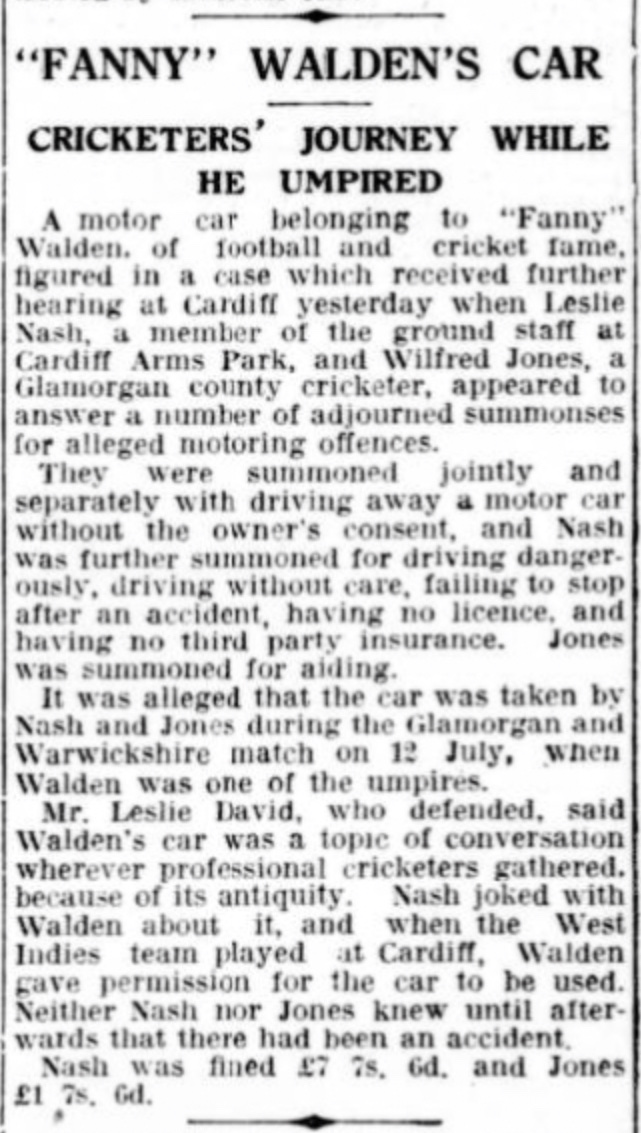
Sunderland Echo, Wednesday, 23 August 1933 - Regarding the incident with Wilf and "Fanny" Walden.

He subsequently enjoyed a decent career as a professional with Pontardawe and Neath. Always dressed in a suit, he cut a dapper figure off the field, tilting his hat to every lady who passed by. He adored etiquette, decorum, respect and fair play besides hating bullying and sledging. His fondness for formal attire meant that he was also very proud of a black top hat, which has remained in the possession of the Jones family and is currently in Rwanda where the father-in-law of Wilfred’s grandson works as a pastor and proudly displays the Welsh flag at his home. His grandson also played county rugby and basketball at the junior level for Glamorgan.
