= Jim Pleass =

Welsh cricketer

Personal information
- Full name: James Edward Pleass
- Born: 21 May 1923; Cardiff, Glamorgan, Wales
- Died: 16 February 2016 (aged 92); Cardiff, Glamorgan, Wales
- Batting: Right-handed

Domestic team information
- Years: Team
- 1947–1956: Glamorgan

Career statistics
| Competition | First-class |
|---|---|
| Matches | 171 |
| Runs scored | 4,293 |
| Batting average | 19.33 |
| 100s/50s | 1/11 |
| Top score | 102* |
| Balls bowled | 24 |
| Wickets | – |
| Bowling average | – |
| 5 wickets in innings | – |
| 10 wickets in match | – |
| Best bowling | – |
| Catches/stumpings | 77/– |
- Source: Cricinfo, 15 February 2012

James Edward Pleass (21 May 1923 – 16 February 2016) was a Welsh cricketer. Pleass was a right-handed batsman.

== Life and career ==
Born in Cardiff, Pleass made his first-class debut for Glamorgan in the 1947 County Championship against Derbyshire. He played first-class cricket for Glamorgan for nearly a decade, making 171 first-class appearances, with his final appearance coming against Warwickshire in the 1956 County Championship. An aggressive middle-order batsman, Pleass scored a total of 4,293 runs at an average of 19.33. He made eleven half centuries, while his sole century, a score of 102 not out, came against Yorkshire in 1955, securing Glamorgan their first victory against Yorkshire in Yorkshire. His most successful season came in 1950, when he made 28 first-class appearances, scoring in the process 740 runs at an average of 24.66. A good cover fielder, Pleass took 77 catches in the field.

Following his retirement from first-class cricket in 1956, Pleass went into business in Cardiff. He served on the Glamorgan committee, and as the secretary of the Glamorgan Former Players Association. Pleass died in Cardiff in February 2016, aged 92. He was the last surviving member of the Glamorgan side that won the 1948 County Championship.
