= Malcolm Hilton =

English cricketer (1928–1990)

Personal information
- Full name: Malcolm Jameson Hilton
- Born: 2 August 1928; Chadderton, Lancashire, England
- Died: 8 July 1990 (aged 61); Oldham, Greater Manchester, England
- Batting: Right-handed
- Bowling: Slow left-arm orthodox

International information
- National side: England
- Test debut: 12 August 1950 v West Indies
- Last Test: 6 February 1952 v India

Career statistics
Competition	Test	First-class
Matches	4	270
Runs scored	37	3,416
Batting average	7.40	12.11
100s/50s	0/0	1/6
Top score	15	100*
Balls bowled	1,244	55,360
Wickets	14	1,006
Bowling average	34.07	19.42
5 wickets in innings	1	51
10 wickets in match	0	8
Best bowling	5/61	8/19
Catches/stumpings	1/–	202/–
- Source: CricInfo, 6 November 2022

Malcolm Jameson Hilton (2 August 1928 – 8 July 1990) was an English left-arm spin bowler, who played for Lancashire and in four Test matches for England.

Cricket writer, Colin Bateman, stated, "he was the best slow left-arm bowler Lancashire had seen this century and, at 22, was in the Test side, seemingly set for life. Hilton, however, suffered the spinners' nightmare, the jitters, and lost his way at times". Bateman added, "He also, say colleagues, enjoyed cricket's social life a little too much although his 1,006 first-class wickets still cost only 19 apiece".

== Early career ==
Hilton was born in Chadderton, Lancashire. He began playing in the Central Lancashire League at Werneth Cricket Club as a teenager in 1945, and made his first-class debut in 1946 against Sussex at Hove, scoring 2 not out and taking one wicket. He came into prominence at the age of 19 by dismissing Donald Bradman twice in Lancashire's match with the Australians in May 1948, making national newspaper headlines. His first 10 wickets were Test batsmen, but Lancashire kept him from the front line up to the end of 1949, until the late Bill Roberts and Eric Price were no longer on the staff. He took 103 wickets for the Second Eleven in the Minor Counties Championship in 1949 and, in 1950, he gained a permanent place in the First Eleven taking 125 wickets for less than 17 runs apiece. He was called up for the final Test match against the West Indies but was not successful.

== England ==
In 1951, he bowled with great steadiness against the South Africans, taking 3 for 176 in the first innings on a featherbed pitch at Headingley during the fourth Test Match. He toured India the following winter, but was criticised in Wisden as lacking the ability to exploit the Indian type of pitch. Despite this, at Kanpur in the Fourth Test he took nine wickets in the match, and led England to victory, alongside his off-spinning Lancastrian colleague Roy Tattersall.

== Career in the mid-1950s ==
However, in 1952, Lancashire began a period of indecision. Hilton often alternated with Bob Berry, a policy that adversely affected both players. In 1953, Hilton played irregularly but returned in the wet summer of 1954 to take 96 wickets. In 1955, although occasionally left out, he took 104 wickets and scored his only century in even time against Northamptonshire.

1956 was Hilton's best season. He took 147 wickets and was chosen as one of Wisden Cricketers of the Year. However, in 1957, he lost accuracy and was frequently left out in favour of Tommy Greenhough. He came back with 94 wickets in 1958, including a career best 8 for 19 against the New Zealanders. His younger brother Jim played a few times for Lancashire, and more often for Somerset. At Weston-super-Mare in 1956, Malcolm Hilton took 14 Somerset wickets and Jim Hilton responded with eight Lancashire victims.

== Later years ==
In the dry summer of 1959, after a poor start by Hilton, Greenhough was preferred as a matter of policy. and Hilton returned to League cricket and the Second Eleven. In 1960, he was jointly awarded a benefit with Tattersall, neither playing in the benefit match. His last appearance was in 1961 at Edgbaston against Warwickshire during a brief recall. He scored 22 and 2, but was heavily punished by Ray Hitchcock during the first innings when he bowled four overs for 26 runs.

Having appeared as a stand-in professional for Church in 1961, Hilton played for Burnley in 1962 and 1963 in the Lancashire League. He later captained Church.

Hilton died in Oldham, Greater Manchester in July 1990, at the age of 61.
