= Don Brennan (cricketer) =

English cricketer

Personal information
- Full name: Donald Vincent Brennan
- Born: 10 February 1920; Eccleshill, Bradford, Yorkshire, England
- Died: 9 January 1985 (aged 64); Ilkley, Yorkshire, England
- Batting: Right-handed
- Role: Wicket-keeper

International information
- National side: England
- Test debut (cap 359): 26 July 1951 v South Africa
- Last Test: 16 August 1951 v South Africa

Domestic team information
- Years: Team
- 1947–1953: Yorkshire
- 1950–1964: MCC

Career statistics
Competition	Test	First-class
Matches	2	232
Runs scored	16	1,937
Batting average	8.00	10.52
100s/50s	0/0	0/1
Top score	16	67*
Catches/stumpings	0/1	310/119
- Source: CricketArchive, 19 December 2008

Donald Vincent Brennan (10 February 1920 – 9 January 1985) was an English cricketer, who played in two Tests in 1951. For his county Yorkshire he was their regular wicket-keeper between 1947 and 1953, taking a total of 380 dismissals in those seven seasons. A poor batsman, he averaged 10.52 in first-class cricket with only a single fifty in 232 appearances. Cricket correspondent, Colin Bateman, noted after Brennan had replaced Godfrey Evans in the England cricket team, that "there can be few higher tributes to his 'keeping skills than that".

== Life and career ==
Born in Eccleshill, Bradford, Yorkshire, Brennan played Bradford League cricket for his home town before his break into first-class cricket in 1947. Brennan played two second XI matches in 1946, but first team opportunities were blocked by Paul Gibb, Arthur Wood and Kenneth Fiddling. However, all three had left the club by the start of the 1947 season, leaving Brennan and Harry Crick in competition for the keeper spot.

Brennan made his first-class debut, aged 27, against the Marylebone Cricket Club (MCC) in Yorkshire's opening fixture of the season, but Crick was selected for five of the six Championship matches in May, thereafter Brennan was a regular, finishing the season with twenty three appearances to Crick's five outings. Brennan was awarded his cap in his maiden season.

He was Yorkshire's only ever-present in the 1948 County season, scoring 104 runs at 4.95 and taking 43 dismissals. He was also a regular in both the 1949 and 1950 seasons, despite Jack Firth, Yorkshire's second choice keeper, averaging more with the bat in his limited opportunities.

Brennan's batting progressed in 1951, his average increasing twofold to 15.81 from 7.80 of the previous season. The improvement came at the right time as he was selected by England, to replace Godfrey Evans, for the fourth Test with South Africa. Brennan made his debut on his home ground, Headingley, alongside fellow debutants Frank Lowson and Peter May. Brennan conceded just one bye in South Africa large first innings total of 538, in England's innings he scored 16 in three-quarters of an hour, before being bowled by Tufty Mann.

Brennan's second Test came three weeks later at The Oval, he took his one Test dismissal in the first innings, with a stumping off the bowling of Jim Laker. However, in his only innings, he was dismissed for a duck.

He was chosen for the MCC's tour of India and Pakistan that winter, however Dick Spooner was selected as keeper for all five Tests. On the tour he scored the only fifty of his first-class career, notching up 67 not out against Maharashtra.

Brennan played two more seasons of county cricket, in 1952 he scored 242 runs at 11 with 62 dismissals. In 1953, he scored 379 runs at 14.03, and took 51 dismissals.

Brennan retired at the end of that season to pursue business commitments with his family textile business. Also after retiring he served on the Yorkshire committee. In 1964, he played a single match for the MCC against Yorkshire.

He died in 1985 at Ilkley, Yorkshire, following a long illness.
