= Alan Shirreff =

English cricketer and pilot

Personal information
- Full name: Alexander Campbell Shirreff
- Born: 12 February 1919; Ealing, Middlesex, England
- Died: 16 December 2006 (aged 87); West Wickham, London, England
- Batting: Right-handed
- Bowling: Right-arm medium

Domestic team information
- Years: Team
- 1939: Cambridge University
- 1946–1957: Combined Services
- 1946–1947: Hampshire
- 1950–1956: Kent
- 1958: Somerset

Career statistics
Competition	First-class
Matches	119
Runs scored	3,887
Batting average	21.71
100s/50s	1/20
Top score	115*
Balls bowled	19,656
Wickets	304
Bowling average	31.49
5 wickets in innings	11
10 wickets in match	0
Best bowling	8/111
Catches/stumpings	88/–
- Source: CricInfo, 28 February 2010

Alexander Campbell Shirreff (12 February 1919 – 16 December 2006), known as Alan Shirreff, was an English pilot who served in the Royal Air Force Volunteer Reserve during the Second World War, and after the war he continued his military service with the Royal Air Force. Shirreff was also an amateur cricketer who played first-class cricket either side of the war, mostly for the Combined Services cricket team and Kent. He played as an all-rounder in nearly 120 matches, taking over 300 wickets with his medium pace deliveries.

== Early life and war service ==
The son of James Arthur Shirreff and his wife, Eleanor, he was born at Ealing in February 1919. He was educated at Dulwich College, where he played for and captained the college cricket team. As a schoolboy he was described as one of the "best bowlers" in Public Schools cricket in 1938, and as a "tower of strength" for Dulwich. From Dulwich, he matriculated to Pembroke College, Cambridge. While studying at Cambridge in his 1939 freshman year, Shirreff made his debut in first-class cricket for Cambridge University against Northamptonshire at Fenner's, with him going onto win his blue by playing in The University Match against Oxford University at Lord's. He played in all twelve of Cambridge's first-class matches in 1939, scoring 219 runs at an average of 13.68, while taking 32 wickets with his medium pace bowling at a bowling average of 34.18. With the outbreak of the Second World War, his studies and nascent first-class career were interrupted.

During the war, he was granted an emergency commission as a pilot officer on probation with the Royal Air Force Volunteer Reserve in September 1941, having been a sergeant prior to his commissioning. He was confirmed in the rank in October 1942, at which point he was promoted to flying officer. In September 1943, he was granted the war substantive rank of flight lieutenant, to which he was appointed on a permanent basis with the Royal Air Force (RAF) in October 1946, following the war. Throughout the war, he served as a pilot with No. 19 Squadron, flying North American P-51 Mustang fighter planes on anti-shipping missions off of the coast of German-occupied Norway from RAF Peterhead in Scotland. During one mission, he shot down a LeO 451, formerly of the French Air Force, but which had been requisitioned by the Luftwaffe. Later in the war, he was posted as an instructor at an operational training centre.

== Post-war cricket career ==
Following the war, Shirreff returned to first-class cricket, while also maintaining his career with the RAF. His first match following the war was for the Combined Services cricket team against Oxford University, with him playing five first-class matches for team in 1946, which included matches against the touring Indians and South Africans. In that same season, he also played one match apiece for the Royal Air Force and the Marylebone Cricket Club (MCC). He also made his debut for Hampshire, making four appearances in the 1946 County Championship. He continued to play for Hampshire in 1947, making an additional eight appearances in the County Championship. In the years following the war, the vast majority of his first-class cricket was played for the Combined Services, for whom he made his only first-class century against Essex in 1950, in which he made an unbeaten 115 as part of an unbeaten opening partnership of 238 with Sidney Smith. From 1946 to 1950, Shirreff had been a steady wicket-taker, taking 137 wickets and six five wicket hauls.

Shirreff began playing for Kent in 1950, making his debut for the county against Warwickshire at Edgbaston. He played for Kent on forty occasions between 1950 and 1956, during which he gained his final promotion in the RAF when he was promoted to squadron leader in January 1951. While commitments with the RAF again limited his availability, Wisden commented that despite this, he was a "persistent seam bowler and modest batsman" for Kent, who did enough to earn his county cap in 1952. For Kent, he took 121 wickets at a bowling average of 30.55, with him taking his career best figures of 8 for 111 against Leicestershire in June 1956. With the bat, he scored 1,503 runs at an average of 21.47, with him making seven half centuries. His most successful season for Kent was in 1955, when he scored 519 runs and took 26 wickets.

Shirreff continued to play first-class cricket for the Combined Services until 1957, bringing his total number of appearances for the team to forty. In these, he took a total of 126 wickets at a bowling average of 27.60, claiming six five wicket hauls, with best figures of 7 for 81. With the bat, he scored 1,492 runs at an average of 24.45, making nine half centuries alongside his lone century. He was remembered for his leadership contributions to services cricket, with Shirreff having captained the RAF from 1946 to 1957 and the Combined Services on various occasions between 1946 and 1957. He was praised for the manner in which he handled the numerous young professionals who played services cricket while undertaking their National Service, where his guidance and sensitive approach to their development as cricketers was noted. Fred Trueman, undertaking his National Service in the RAF, was an admirer of Shirreff. In a match for the Combined Services against the touring Australians, Trueman refused to carry on bowling after fourteen overs, with his chief grievance being that Shirreff was not captaining the side (Michael Ainsworth was instead preferred as captain).

Upon retiring from the RAF in 1958, Shirreff was appointed to succeed Bill Andrews as Somerset coach and assistant-secretary in April 1958, with the original intention being he would also captain the side in place of Maurice Tremlett, however his succession to the captaincy did not materialise as the Somerset committee elected to retain Tremlett as captain. He only played twice for Somerset, in the 1958 County Championship against Sussex and Essex, with it being noted that his presence in the first eleven was not appreciated by Tremlett. Following a deterioration in his relationship with Tremlett, which resulted in the pair falling out, Shirreff resigned his tenure as coach and assistant-secretary in October 1958. Andrews, whom he had succeeded, lamented the way in which Shirreff was treated, commenting "I have never known anyone treated so badly".

In addition to playing first-class cricket for the aforementioned teams, Shirreff also made four first-class appearances for MCC between 1946 and 1955 and two for the Free Foresters in 1949 and 1950. His overall first-class career was 119 matches, in which he took 304 wickets at a bowling average of 31.49, while with the bat he scored 3,887 runs at an average of 21.71. He was described by the Kent cricket historian Derek Carlaw as a "bits and pieces cricketer", alluding to his all-round qualities.

== Later life and death ==
After leaving the first-class game, Shirreff entered into business with soft drinks manufacturer Schweppes, with whom he had a successful career. He continued to play club cricket, mostly for Dulwich Cricket Club. Shirreff died at West Wickham in Bromley in December 2006, aged 87.

== Works cited ==
- Carlaw, Derek. Kent Cricketers A to Z (PDF). Vol. 3. Cardiff: ACS.
- Winterbotham, Hubert (1939). Public school cricket in 1938 (PDF). London: Wisden Cricketers' Almanack.
- Trueman, Fred (2005). As It Was: The Memoirs. London: Macmillan Publishers. ISBN 9780330427050.
