= Billy Neale (cricketer) =

English cricketer (1904–1955)

Personal information
- Full name: William Legge Neale
- Born: 3 March 1904; Berkeley, Gloucestershire, England
- Died: 26 October 1955 (aged 51); Gloucester, England
- Batting: Right-handed
- Bowling: Right arm slow
- Role: Batsman

Domestic team information
- Years: Team
- 1923–1948: Gloucestershire

Career statistics
Competition	First-class
Matches	452
Runs scored	14,752
Batting average	23.75
100s/50s	14/72
Top score	145*
Balls bowled	6,231
Wickets	100
Bowling average	39.70
5 wickets in innings	1
10 wickets in match	0
Best bowling	6/9
Catches/stumpings	227/0
- Source: CricInfo, 25 August 2022

William Legge Neale (3 March 1904 – 26 October 1955) was an English professional cricketer who played for Gloucestershire County Cricket Club from 1923 to 1948. He was born in Berkeley, Gloucestershire, and died in Gloucester. Neale was a right-handed batter who scored 14,752 runs in 452 first-class matches with a highest score of 145* among fourteen centuries. An occasional right-arm slow bowler, he took 100 career wickets. Rated an excellent outfielder, he completed 227 catches.

== Career ==
Born in Berkeley, Gloucestershire, Billy Neale was educated at Cirencester Grammar School and began his first-class cricket career in 1923, playing for Gloucestershire County Cricket Club as an amateur. Six years later, he turned professional. Neale had the reputation of being a steady right-handed batter, generally selected in the middle order. Gloucestershire is the only team he played for in 452 first-class matches. He played for several other teams in minor matches, including Cirencester Old Grammarians in 1948. He took part in a handful of service matches during World War II, though he did not represent any service teams.

He was 19 when he made his first-class debut in a home County Championship match against Lancashire at the Wagon Works Ground in June 1923. George Duckworth, Lancashire's great international wicket-keeper, made his debut in the same match. Batting at #6, Neale was run out for 35 in the first innings and bowled by Dick Tyldesley for 0 in the second. Lancashire won the match by 75 runs.

Neale was selected for occasional matches until the 1927 season when, aged 23, he became a first-team regular. He achieved his highest career score in June 1927 with an innings of 145 not out against Hampshire at the County Ground, Southampton, the first of fourteen career centuries. He was awarded his county cap that season.

In the 1937 season, Neale shared a partnership with Wally Hammond which created a club record. They added 321 for the fourth wicket against Leicestershire at the Wagon Works. Neale scored 121 and Hammond 217. Neale's most successful season was 1938 when he scored 1,488 runs at an average of 29.76, including five centuries. He achieved the target of 1,000 runs in a season six times.

Though he bowled only occasionally, Neale was considered a useful option because he apparently had a knack for breaking stubborn partnerships after the regular bowlers had failed to do so. His style was right arm slow (i.e., with little or no spin) and he took 100 career wickets in his 452 matches. Playing against Somerset at Nevil Road in 1937, he took six wickets for a mere nine runs, his career best bowling analysis. As a fielder, Neale specialised in outfield positions (near the boundary) and his obituary says he "excelled" in the role. He completed 227 career catches.

Neale was awarded a testimonial in the 1946 season which raised £2,747. He was a regular member of the Gloucestershire team until 1947. The inaugural 1948 edition of Playfair Cricket Annual mentions him, in its review of Gloucestershire's 1947 matches, as having "batted steadily" while scoring 881 runs with a highest score of 143. Playfair records that Gloucestershire and Middlesex were involved in a "great tussle" for the 1947 County Championship which was not settled until after the penultimate matches were completed, Middlesex taking the title and Gloucestershire finishing second. In August, the Gloucestershire v Middlesex match at the College Ground, Cheltenham was decisive. Middlesex won a close-fought match by 68 runs after Gloucestershire's batting surprisingly collapsed in the fourth innings. Neale was given due credit by Playfair for his performance in that match. The 1948 edition of Wisden Cricketers' Almanack says of Neale's batting in 1947 that he was a "patient" batsman who, like his colleague Jack Crapp, "proved a mainstay in run-getting". (Note: No public domain image of Neale has been found, but he is pictured with Gloucestershire's 1947 team in both the Wisden and Playfair 1948 galleries, seated first right on the front row.)

Aged 44, Neale made only a handful of appearances in the 1948 season. He was replaced in the team by the club's rising star, 21 year old Tom Graveney. Neale's final first-class appearance was in the Warwickshire v Gloucestershire match at Edgbaston, 16–18 June 1948. Having been run out for 35 in his debut innings in 1923, he was run out for 34 in his final innings 25 years later. The match was impacted by rain, mostly falling on the second day, and ended in a draw.

== Retirement, family and death ==
Neale decided to retire after the 1948 season. He and his wife, Phyllis Mary Neale (1910–1983), lived in the Gloucestershire village of Breadstone, near Stroud, until Billy's death in 1955. His obituary in the 1956 edition of Wisden states that he died after a long illness in hospital at Gloucester on 26 October 1955, aged 51. The 1956 Playfair includes him in its obituary section, saying that he was a "very useful middle-order batsman", though "rarely in the headlines"; it confirms his career runs and centuries. Billy and Phyllis Neale are buried together at the Berkeley Cemetery on Gilbert Hill in Stroud. The headstone confirms that he was known as Billy Neale and they were residents of Breadstone (see photo in source).

== Sources ==
- Playfair Cricket Annual, 1st edition, editor Peter West, Playfair Books, 1948
- Playfair Cricket Annual, 2nd edition, editor Peter West, Playfair Books, 1949
- Playfair Cricket Annual, 9th edition, editor Gordon Ross, Playfair Books, 1956
- Wisden Cricketers' Almanack, 85th edition, editor Hubert Preston, Sporting Handbooks Ltd, 1948
