= Arthur Porter =

Arthur Porter may refer to:

- Arthur Porter (MP) (died 1559), English politician during the 16th century
- Arthur Kingsley Porter (1883–1933), American art historian and medievalist
- Arthur Porter (engineer) (1910–2010), British-Canadian engineer and computer pioneer
- Arthur Porter (cricketer) (1914–1994), English cricketer
- Arthur Porter (historian) (1924–2019), Creole professor and author
- W. Arthur Porter (born 1941), American educator and businessman
- Arthur Porter (physician) (1956–2015), Canadian physician and former chair of the Security Intelligence Review Committee

Art Porter may refer to:

- Art Porter Sr. (1934–1993), American jazz pianist
- Art Porter Jr. (1961–1996), American jazz saxophonist and son of Art Porter, Sr.
