= Tom Sidwell =

English cricketer

Personal information
- Full name: Thomas Edgar Sidwell
- Born: 30 January 1888; Belgrave, Leicester, England
- Died: 8 December 1958 (aged 70); Braunstone Frith, Leicestershire, England
- Batting: Right-handed
- Role: Wicket-keeper

Domestic team information
- Years: Team
- 1913–1933: Leicestershire
- FC debut: 12 July 1913 Leicestershire v Warwickshire
- Last FC: 30 August 1933 Leicestershire v Surrey

Career statistics
Competition	First-class
Matches	392
Runs scored	7,929
Batting average	15.30
100s/50s	3/19
Top score	105
Catches/stumpings	584/136
- Source: CricketArchive, 10 April 2010

Thomas Edgar Sidwell (30 January 1888 – 8 December 1958) was an English cricketer. A right-hand batsman and a wicketkeeper, Sidwell made 392 appearances for Leicestershire County Cricket Club between 1913 and 1933. His 551 catches and 127 stumpings were a county record until beaten by Roger Tolchard, and his keeping skill made him a rival of incumbent national keeper Bert Strudwick though Sidwell was never selected for England. Two of his three centuries came in the 1928 season when he hit 1,153 runs, and he batted in both the lower and top order.

== Career ==
Sidwell first played for Leicestershire in 1913, debuting on 12 July against Warwickshire. Batting at number nine, he made seven runs before taking two catches and a stumping as William Shipman routed the opposition without Leicestershire having to bat again. Sidwell made four more appearances for his county that season. The following year he was taken on the staff and appeared in the full 22 matches, scoring 315 runs, taking 34 catches and making six stumpings. His career was then interrupted by the First World War, the outbreak of which in August 1914 led to the early termination of the 1914 County Championship, and no further first-class cricket was played for the duration of the war.

The County Championship resumed in 1919, when he played 15 games, taking 27 more catches and five more stumpings, followed by 34 catches and 10 stumpings in 1920. He would become a regular on the team list for the rest of his career. Sent in on one occasion during 1921 as a nightwatchman, Sidwell survived until morning. However while travelling to the ground – The Oval in Surrey – for the next day's play, he became lost on the London Underground and was given out while mid-transit. The resulting disagreement between the cricket administrative body and Surrey's captain Percy Fender created a minor media stir.

Though he never made an international appearance, Sidwell played for the Rest of England and the North of England in 1922 and 1923 respectively, and appeared in a first-class England XI in 1929. He enjoyed a benefit season with his club in 1926, where he played 28 matches, scoring 892 runs at 22.30 (with his only other century), taking 36 and performing nine stumpings. Two years later in 1928 he hit 1,153 runs – a career best – including the two centuries and five half-centuries. He retired after the 1931 season, but reappeared in 1933 when Percy Corrall, his replacement as Leicestershire wicketkeeper, was injured, making 13 appearances. Between 1914 and 1931 he only missed six matches. He went on to play club cricket until 1957.
