= Len Clark (cricketer) =

English cricketer

Personal information
- Full name: Leonard Stanley Clark
- Born: 6 March 1914; Manor Park, Essex, England
- Died: 2 May 2000 (aged 86); Leigh-on-Sea, Essex, England
- Batting: Right-handed
- Bowling: Right-arm medium
- Role: Batsman

Domestic team information
- Years: Team
- 1946–1947: Essex

Career statistics
Competition	First-class
Matches	24
Runs scored	745
Batting average	18.17
100s/50s	0/4
Top score	64
Balls bowled	30
Wickets	–
Bowling average	–
5 wickets in innings	–
10 wickets in match	–
Best bowling	–
Catches/stumpings	11/–
- Source: Cricinfo, 10 November 2011

Leonard Stanley Clark (6 March 1914 – 2 May 2000) was an English cricketer who played first-class cricket for Essex in 1946 and 1947.

Clark was born at Manor Park, Essex. A right-handed batsman, he made his first-class debut for Essex against Derbyshire in the 1946 County Championship. He made 23 further first-class appearances for the county, the last of which came against Glamorgan in the 1947 County Championship. In his 24 first-class appearances, he scored 745 runs at an average of 18.17, with a high score of 64. This score, which was one of four fifties he made, came in the tied match against Northamptonshire in May 1947.

Clark died at Leigh-on-Sea, Essex, on 2 May 2000, aged 86.
