= Harry Sharp (cricketer) =

English cricketer, coach, and scorer

Harry Philip Hugh Sharp (6 October 1917 – 15 January 1995) was an English cricketer, cricket coach and Scorer.

Harry Sharp was born in Kentish Town and played for London Schools. He was spotted by Jack Durston while practising at the Middlesex Indoor School at Acton. Seconded to Marylebone Cricket Club (MCC), his duties included rolling the wicket.

He joined Middlesex County Cricket Club in 1934 and made his 1st XI debut in 1946. He played in 162 first-class matches as a right-handed batsman before his retirement in 1955. He scored 6,141 runs at an average of 25.80, with 9 hundreds and 30 fifties. He took 59 catches and 50 wickets with his off-spin at an average of 32.56, with a personal best of 5/52. He was awarded his county cap in 1948. His best season was in 1953, when he scored 1,564 runs. He was awarded a joint benefit with Alec Thompson by Middlesex in 1955 and a joint testimonial by MCC with Len Muncer in 1971.

He served as an Able Seaman with the Eastern Front in the Indian Ocean, during the Second World War, but saw little action. Despite this, he gained the nickname of 'Admiral', which remained with him for the rest of his life. He played in several matches, while docked at Durban.

He joined the MCC coaching staff in 1956 and also umpired several first-class matches. He became MCC's Assistant Head Coach and he succeeded Jim Sims as the Middlesex scorer in 1973. He retired at the age of 75 and died suddenly in Enfield, Middlesex in 1995.
