= 1948 County Championship =

English cricket tournament

- Cricket format: First-class cricket (3 days)
- Tournament format: League system
- Champions: Glamorgan (1st title)
- Participants: 17
- Matches: 221
- Most runs: Arthur Fagg (2,404 for Kent)
- Most wickets: Tom Pritchard (163 for Warwickshire)

The 1948 County Championship was the 49th officially organised running of the County Championship, and ran from 8 May to 31 August 1948. Glamorgan County Cricket Club claimed their first title.

In August 1948, Glamorgan's match against Gloucestershire at Eugene Cross Park, play was stopped due to mountain mist around the ground and a flock of sheep.

== Table ==
- 12 points for a win
- 6 points to each team in a match in which scores finish level
- 4 points for first innings lead in a lost or drawn match
- 2 points for tie on first innings in a lost or drawn match
- If no play possible on the first two days, the match played to one-day laws with 8 points for a win.

	Team	P	W	L	D	No Dec	1st Inns Lead	Pts
1	Glamorgan	26	13	5	6	2	4	172
2	Surrey	26	12	9	5 (Note: 8 points were awarded to Surrey for a draw against Gloucestershire, which they won under one-day rules.)	0	4	168
3	Middlesex	26	13	4	8	1	1	160
4	Yorkshire	26	11	4	10	1	6	156
5	Lancashire	26	8	2	15	1	14	152
6	Derby9	7	9	1	5	128		
9	Hampshire	26	9	8	8	1	3	120
10	Worcestershire	26	6	8	11	1	8	104
11	Leicestershire	26	6	11	8	1	6	96
12	Somerset	26	5	14	6	1	8	92
13	Essex	26	5	8	11 (Note: 6 points were awarded to both Essex and Nottinghamshire after they drew with the scores equal, meaning it was rewarded the same as a tie.)	2	6	90
14	Nottinghamshire	26	5	10	9 (Note: 6 points were awarded to both Essex and Nottinghamshire after they drew with the scores equal, meaning it was rewarded the same as a tie.)	2	4	82
15	Kent	26	4	11	10	1	7	76
16	Sussex	26	4	11	10	1	6	72
17	Northamptonshire	26	3	9	14	0	4	52

== Leading averages ==
=== Batting ===
Aggregate	Average	Player	County
1,391	92.73	Cyril Washbrook	Lancashire
1,565	92.05	Len Hutton	Yorkshire
1,236	61.80	Denis Compton	Middlesex
1,331	60.50	Bill Edrich	Middlesex
1,435	57.40	Jack Crapp	Gloucestershire
2,404	57.23	Arthur Fagg	Kent
1,855	54.55	Jack Robertson	Middlesex
Qualification: 1,000 runs, 50.00 average. Source: CricketArchive

=== Bowling ===
Aggregate	Average	Player	County
124	15.57	Cliff Gladwin	Derbyshire
139	16.38	Len Muncer	Glamorgan
100	17.24	George Pope	Derbyshire
163	17.47	Tom Pritchard	Warwickshire
129	17.62	Johnny Wardle	Yorkshire
109	17.97	Jim Bailey	Hampshire
Qualification: 100 wickets, 18.00 average. Source: CricketArchive
