= Victor Ransom =

English cricketer

Personal information
- Full name: Victor Joseph Ransom
- Born: 17 May 1917; New Malden, Surrey, England
- Died: 23 September 1998 (aged 81); Esher, Surrey, England
- Batting: Right-handed
- Bowling: Right-arm fast-medium

Domestic team information
- Years: Team
- 1947–1950: Hampshire
- 1950–1951: Marylebone Cricket Club
- 1951–1955: Surrey

Career statistics
Competition	First-class
Matches	40
Runs scored	455
Batting average	9.68
100s/50s	–/1
Top score	58
Balls bowled	7,179
Wickets	98
Bowling average	35.39
5 wickets in innings	3
10 wickets in match	–
Best bowling	5/50
Catches/stumpings	21/–
- Source: Cricinfo, 25 January 2010

Victor Joseph Ransom (17 May 1917 — 23 September 1998) was an English first-class cricketer.

Ransom was born at New Malden in May 1917. During the Second World War, he served as a sailor in the Royal Navy and played for them in minor cricket matches. He first came to the attention of Hampshire, then rebuilding under the captaincy and secretaryship of Desmond Eagar following the war, in club cricket for Malden Wanderers Cricket Club and was specially registered to play for Hampshire. Ransom made his debut in first-class cricket for Hampshire against Sussex at Portsmouth in the 1947 County Championship, taking eight wickets in the match. He made eighteen appearances in 1947, taking 54 wickets at an average of 28.05; he took all three of his career five wicket hauls during this season, with best figures of 5 for 50. However, the strong start to his first-class career did not continue beyond his debut season. He made just nine appearances for Hampshire in 1948, and six in 1949, taking 19 and 13 wickets respectively. With the emergence of Derek Shackleton, Ransom found his opportunities at Hampshire restricted; in 1950, he made just one first-class appearance against Cambridge University and left at the end of that season. In total, Ransom made 34 first-class appearances for Hampshire, taking 88 wickets at an average of 34.89. With the bat, he scored 419 runs at an average of 9.97; he made one half century, a score of 58 against Gloucestershire in 1949. Whilst playing for Hampshire, Ransom also made one first-class appearance for the South in the North v South fixture in 1949, and twice for the Marylebone Cricket Club (MCC) in 1949 and 1950.

Ransom subsequently played two first-class matches for Surrey, both against Cambridge University in 1951 and 1955. He also made a further first-class appearance for the MCC against Cambridge University in 1951. Although he only made two first-class appearances for Surrey, he played for and captained the Surrey Second XI until 1961. He continued to play club cricket for Malden Wanderers, later becoming their opening batsman. Outside of cricket, Ransom ran a butchers for many years. He died at Esher in September 1998.
