= Harry Pickering (cricketer) =

English cricketer

Personal information
- Full name: Harry Gordon Pickering
- Batting: Right-handed
- Bowling: Right-arm slow

Domestic team information
- Years: Team
- 1947: Leicestershire
- 1938: Essex

Career statistics
Competition	First-class
Matches	8
Runs scored	297
Batting average	18.56
100s/50s	0/3
Top score	79
Catches/stumpings	0/–
- Source: Cricinfo, 25 October 2011

Harry Gordon Pickering (18 January 1917 – 4 March 1984) was an English cricketer. Pickering was a right-handed batsman who bowled right-arm slow. He was born at Hackney, London.

Pickering made his first-class debut for Essex against Surrey in the 1938 County Championship. He made two further first-class appearances for Essex in that seasons, against Somerset and Middlesex. He scored 62 runs in his three matches, at an average of 10.33, with a high score of 17. This was his only season with Essex. Following World War II, Pickering joined Leicestershire in 1947, making his debut for the county against Gloucestershire. He made four further first-class appearances for Leicestershire, all of which came in the 1947 County Championship. He had more success in his brief stint with Leicestershire, scoring 235 runs at an average of 23.50, with a high score of 79. This score, which was one of three fifties he made for Leicestershire, came against Surrey in his final match.

He died on 4 March 1984 at Seaford, Sussex.
