= Commonwealth XI cricket team in India and Ceylon in 1950–51 =

International cricket tour

A Commonwealth XI cricket team toured India and Ceylon from 1 October 1950 to 6 March 1951 and played 27 first-class matches including five unofficial "test matches" against an All-India XI and one against an All-Ceylon XI.

The team was nominally captained by Les Ames but he had injury problems and often had to hand over to his deputy Frank Worrell. The team was judged to be stronger than the England team which was concurrently (and disastrously) touring Australia. There were numerous problems with health and injury issues which caused early withdrawals but it included Jim Laker, Sonny Ramadhin, Derek Shackleton, Jack Ikin, Harold Gimblett, Fred Ridgway, Dick Spooner, George Tribe, Les Jackson, Bruce Dooland, George Emmett, Laurie Fishlock, Harold Stephenson, Ken Grieves, Ray Dovey and Billy Sutcliffe.

The Commonwealth XI were unbeaten on the tour. They won the second match against India at Bombay's Brabourne Stadium by ten wickets. This was the only one of the unofficial "tests" in which Jim Laker could take part (he went home soon after this match for health reasons) and he took eight wickets in the match. The Commonwealth XI won the fifth match against India by 77 runs thanks to Worrell, who scored 116 and 71 not out, and Ramadhin, who took nine wickets in the match. The other three matches against India were drawn as was the international in Colombo against Ceylon. Worrell played a magnificent innings of 285 but Ceylon managed to hold on for a draw with their last pair together when time ran out. Ramadhin took eight wickets in the match.
