= Fanny Walden =

English footballer and cricketer

Personal information
- Full name: Frederick Ingram Walden
- Date of birth: 1 March 1888
- Place of birth: Wellingborough, England
- Date of death: 3 May 1949 (aged 61)
- Place of death: Northampton, England
- Height: 5 ft 2 in (1.57 m)
- Position: Outside right

Senior career*
Years	Team	Apps	(Gls)
1905–1906	White Cross		
1906–1907	All Saints		
1907–1908	Rodwell		
1908–1909	Wellingborough		
1909–1913	Northampton Town	108	(26)
1913–1924	Tottenham Hotspur	214	(21)
1926–1927	Northampton Town	20	(1)
Total		342	(48)

International career
1914–1922	England	2	(0)
	Football League XI	1	
	Southern League XI	3	
- * Club domestic league appearances and goals

Frederick Ingram Walden (1 March 1888 – 3 May 1949) was an English professional footballer who played outside right for Northampton Town, Tottenham Hotspur and at international level for England during the 1910s and 1920s. He also played cricket for Northamptonshire and was an English cricket umpire.

== Football career ==
Walden was born in Wellingborough, Northamptonshire and after playing football for various clubs in his home town, he started his professional career in 1909 at Northampton Town, then playing in the Southern League.

On 13 April 1913, he was transferred to Tottenham Hotspur for a fee of £1,700. Being only 5 ft 2 in tall he was often described as a 'diminutive winger' and known for his 'darting jinking runs down the right flank'. His small stature also accounted for his nickname 'Fanny' which was in common use during his time to describe those of 'dainty physique'.

He continued to play for Tottenham after the enforced break caused by the First World War, during which he served in the Royal Naval Volunteer Reserve, the Royal Naval Air Service and the Royal Air Force. He made his most important contribution for Spurs in the team which won the Second Division title in 1920 but the following year unfortunately missed the 1921 FA Cup Final due to injury. He went on to play in over 300 games for Spurs including 214 league games (scoring 21 goals) and 22 FA Cup matches (3 goals) before leaving the club in July 1924. He returned to Northampton Town to finish his career in the 1926–27 season.

Walden won his first of two England Caps on 4 April 1914 against Scotland. The second, on 13 March 1922, was against Wales. Unsurprisingly, he holds the record for being the smallest ever footballer to represent England at national level.

== Cricket career ==
Walden played first-class cricket at county level for Northamptonshire between 1910 and 1929. A right-handed batsman, he scored over 7538 runs, and as a slow right-hand bowler he took 119 wickets in 258 matches.

After retiring from playing he became an umpire, standing in 212 first-class matches between 1930 and 1939, and in 11 Test matches from 1934 (England v Australia at Old Trafford) until 1939 (England vs West Indies at Lord's). He stood with Frank Chester at The Oval in 1938 during England's record Ashes victory of an innings and 579 runs.

Walden's car was once stolen at Cardiff Arms Park by a ground employee and Glamorgan cricketer Wilf Jones in order to take it for a joyride.

Walden died in Northampton on 3 May 1949, aged 61.

== Career statistics ==
=== International ===
Appearances and goals by national team and year
National team	Year	Apps	Goals
England	1914	1	0
England	1922	1	0
Total		2	0

== Honours ==
Tottenham Hotspur

- Football League Second Division: 1919–20
- FA Charity Shield: 1921
