= Billy Sutcliffe =

English cricketer

Personal information
- Full name: William Herbert Hobbs Sutcliffe
- Born: 10 October 1926; Pudsey, Yorkshire, England
- Died: 16 September 1998 (aged 71); Collingham, West Yorkshire
- Batting: Right-handed
- Bowling: Right-arm medium, leg-break
- Role: Batsman, captain

Domestic team information
- Years: Team
- 1948–1957: Yorkshire

Career statistics
Competition	First-class
Matches	210
Runs scored	7530
Batting average	26.42
100s/50s	6/38
Top score	181
Balls bowled	672
Wickets	15
Bowling average	22.26
5 wickets in innings	–
10 wickets in match	–
Best bowling	2/12
Catches/stumpings	90/–
- Source: Cricinfo, 25 October 2013

William Herbert Hobbs Sutcliffe (10 October 1926 – 16 September 1998) was an English amateur first-class cricketer, and the son of Herbert Sutcliffe; his middle name was in honour of Jack Hobbs.

Sutcliffe was born in Pudsey, near Leeds, Yorkshire, England. Playing as a right-handed batsman and occasional medium and leg break bowler, he made his debut for Yorkshire County Cricket Club in 1948, and retired from the first-class game in 1959. In 210 first-class matches, he scored 7,530 runs, with a career best score of 181 against Kent in 1952, at an average of 26.42. He scored six centuries in all, including 171 not out against Worcestershire and 161 not out against Glamorgan. Bob Appleyard recalled that Sutcliffe batted with a 2 pounds 6 ounces bat, which had to be specially made as it was considered very heavy in its day.

He toured India with the Commonwealth XI in 1950-51 (adding 301 for the fourth wicket with Frank Worrell in the match against Ceylon), and Pakistan with the MCC in 1955–56.

Sutcliffe captained Yorkshire as an amateur for two years in 1956 and 1957. He led a recovering Yorkshire to third in the County Championship in his final season in charge. Brian Close called him "a super lad who made himself into a county cricketer because it was expected of him, and because he believed in Yorkshire cricket and its right to pre-eminence. He was happier having a pint and a natter than he was in cracking the whip on the field". The Yorkshire and England spin bowler and Marylebone Cricket Club (MCC) coach Don Wilson said "It was unfair to suggest he was only in the job because of his name. He was a great league player and had proved himself a knowledgeable captain for Leeds. It was the senior players who were at the root of this malediction."

He later served on the Yorkshire committee, and on the Test selection panel in 1969 and 1970.

He died in September 1998 in Collingham, Yorkshire.
