= Alan Fairbairn =

English cricketer

Personal information
- Nationality: British (English)
- Born: 25 January 1923 Winchmore Hill, England
- Died: 7 March 2005 (aged 82) Enfield, London, England

Sport
- Sport: Cricket / Squash
- Club: Middlesex CCC
Medal record
British Amateur Championships
Gold medal – first place	1952/1953	singles
Gold medal – first place	1953/1954	singles

Alan Fairbairn (25 January 1923 – 7 March 2005) was an English cricketer and squash player.

== Early life ==
Born in Winchmore Hill, Middlesex, he played club cricket for Southgate and also first-class cricket for Middlesex.

== Cricket career ==
He played in 21 matches as a left-handed batsman (1947–1951).

Fairbairn was awarded his county cap in 1947 when he was a member of the Middlesex team that won the County Championship. He scored 776 runs in first-class cricket with a highest score of 110 not out, one of two centuries.

== Squash career ==
Fairbairn was a champion squash player, winning the British Amateur Squash Championships during the 1952/1953 and 1953/1954 seasons.

== Personal life and death ==
Fairbairn was a solicitor by profession. He died in Enfield, Middlesex on 7 March 2005 aged 82.

== Sources ==
- Alan Fairbairn at CricketArchive
- Playfair Cricket Annual – 1948 edition
