= William Roberts (Lancashire cricketer) =

English cricketer

Bill Roberts
Personal information
- Full name: William Braithwaite Roberts
- Born: 27 September 1914; Kirkham, Lancashire, England
- Died: 23 August 1951 (aged 36); Bangor, Caernarvonshire, Wales
- Batting: Right-handed
- Bowling: Slow left-arm orthodox

Domestic team information
- Years: Team
- 1939 to 1949: Lancashire

Career statistics
Competition	FC
Matches	119
Runs scored	865
Batting average	10.67
100s/50s	0/1
Top score	51
Balls bowled	27,286
Wickets	392
Bowling average	21.16
5 wickets in innings	25
10 wickets in match	3
Best bowling	8/50
Catches/stumpings	53/0
- Source: Cricinfo, 8 August 2018

William (Bill) Braithwaite Roberts (27 September 1914 – 23 August 1951) played first-class cricket for Lancashire as a lower-order batsman and left-arm spin bowler between 1939 and 1949. He has been described as "a slim blue-eyed type with a mop of wavy brown hair and the habitual expression of a schoolboy having just run away from ringing some grown-up's front doorbell." He was educated at Kirkham Grammar School and joined the County Club after leaving school, debuting in July 1939 taking 13 wickets in six games before the outbreak of war.

Roberts joined an infantry regiment at the beginning of the war. While serving in the Army, Roberts showed good form in the cricket matches he was able to take part in, and he was chosen to play for England in three of the Victory Tests in 1945, taking five wickets an average of 26.8. He also took 6/21 against a West Indian XI at Lord's that year. He had a sardonic sense of humour, describing Plum Warner as "just a grandiloquent juggler who threw people in and out of the side at will." He had four successful seasons for Lancashire from 1946 to 1949, taking 382 wickets at an average of 20.89 with his accurate spin which included an effective arm ball, delivered quicker than his stock deliveries. His obituary in The Guardian said that "he was one of the most loveable characters that ever walked a cricket field. He may have played cricket partly to earn money, but he played cricket mainly because he loved it."

Roberts became famous when he dismissed Australian batsman Don Bradman in 1948. He took 6 for 73 off 42 overs in the Australians' first innings, then when batting on the last day he held out against the bowling of Ray Lindwall to give Lancashire a draw. His best first-class figures were 8 for 50 (match figures of 51.5–23–83–11) for Lancashire against Oxford University in 1949. He headed Lancashire's bowling averages in 1948 and 1949, but the younger left-arm spinners Malcolm Hilton and Bob Berry replaced him in the county team and he spent the 1950 season in the second team and playing club cricket for Manchester, also substituting as Littleborough's professional and taking 10 wickets at 11.1. He received a testimonial of £2623 at the end of the 1950 season.

Granted his release by Lancashire, Roberts signed for West Bromwich Dartmouth CC in the Birmingham League for the 1951 and 1952 seasons, but was only able to play two games before the recurrence of an illness that had necessitated an internal operation some months before. His record in those games meant he topped the League averages with 10 wickets at 7.60 but he suffered a relapse and died suddenly whilst on holiday in Bangor in August of that year, aged 36.
