= Jack Parker (cricketer) =

English cricketer

Cricket information
- Batting: Right-handed
- Bowling: Right-arm medium

Career statistics
Competition	First-class
Matches	340
Runs scored	14,272
Batting average	31.57
100s/50s	20/79
Top score	255
Balls bowled	36,465
Wickets	543
Bowling average	28.87
5 wickets in innings	8
10 wickets in match	0
Best bowling	6/34
Catches/stumpings	331/–
- Source: CricketArchive, 6 December 2022

John Frederick Parker (23 April 1913 – 26 January 1983) was an English cricketer. He was an all-rounder and a good slip fielder, whose long first-class career with Surrey linked the days of Jack Hobbs with those of Peter May.

A tall man, he might have achieved even more than he did but for back trouble. Even so, he was an essential member of the Surrey side for many years. As a batsman, he preferred to attack, and was an especially fine driver of the ball. He was often at his best in a crisis. He reached a thousand runs in a season nine times in succession (1938–1939 and 1946–1952 – this excludes 1945, in which season he played in only one match). His medium-paced bowling was generally steady rather than particularly penetrative. He took 50 or more wickets in a season 5 times, but never managed more than 67.

He never played Test cricket, although he was picked as a member of the party to India in 1939–40, for a tour which never took place because of the outbreak of World War II. The War also deprived him of six of what, judging by his age, might have been expected to be amongst his best seasons.

Most of his best years were after the war, for it was not until 1937 that he became a really valuable member of the side. He had his best season with the ball, in terms of his average, in 1946, taking 56 wickets at only 15.58 each. He made his highest score of 255 in 1949 against the touring New Zealanders, the innings taking only six and a half hours. That season was his best with the bat, both in terms of aggregate (1789) and average (40.65). He finished on a high note, retiring after the 1952 season in which Surrey won the County Championship outright for the first time since 1914, having shared the title in 1950.
