= Clifford Monks =

English cricketer

Clifford Ivon Monks (4 March 1912 – 23 January 1974) was an English first-class cricketer. He was a right-handed batsman and a right-arm medium pace bowler who played from 1935 to 1952 for Gloucestershire County Cricket Club. Monks was born at Keynsham, Somerset.

Monks made 65 first-class appearances, scoring 1,589 runs @ 18.91 with a highest innings of 120, his sole century in addition to 7 half-centuries. He held 32 catches and took 36 wickets @ 45.25 with a best analysis of 4–70.

Monks died at Coalpit Heath, Bristol on 23 January 1974.
