= Phil Clift =

Welsh cricketer

Phil Brittain Clift (3 September 1918 – 22 May 2005) was a Welsh cricketer active from 1937 to 1955 who played for Glamorgan. He was born in Usk, Monmouthshire, and died in Cardiff. He appeared in 183 first-class matches as a righthanded batsman who bowled off breaks. He scored 6,055 runs with a highest score of 125 not out among seven centuries and took eleven wickets with a best performance of three for 6.
