= Aubrey Hill (cricketer) =

Welsh cricketer

William Aubrey Hill (27 April 1910 – 11 August 1995) was a Welsh cricketer who played for Warwickshire and was active from 1929 to 1948. He was born in Carmarthen and died in Blackpool. He appeared in 169 first-class matches as a righthanded batsman who bowled right arm medium pace. He scored 6,423 runs with the highest score of 147 not out among six centuries and took one wickets with the best performance of one for 4.

Hill is the grandfather of former broadcaster Vic McGlynn, and great-grandfather of actress Molly McGlynn.
