= John Nye (cricketer) =

English cricketer

John Kent Nye (23 May 1914 – 26 January 2002) was an English cricketer active from 1934 to 1947 who played for Sussex. He was born in Isfield, Sussex and died in Chichester. He appeared in 99 first-class matches as a righthanded batsman who bowled left arm fast medium. He scored 885 runs with a highest score of 55 and took 304 wickets with a best performance of six for 95. Nye moved to Kenya after finishing with Sussex in 1947.

== See also ==
- Playfair Cricket Annual, 1st edition, 1948
