= Bill Fantham =

English cricketer

William Ernest Fantham (14 May 1918 – 16 April 2006) was an English first-class cricketer from 1935 to 1948 who played for Warwickshire. He was born in Birmingham and died in Leicester. He appeared in 63 first-class matches as a right-handed batsman who bowled off breaks. He scored 1168 runs with a highest score of 51 and took 64 wickets with a best performance of five for 55.
