= Alfred Barlow (cricketer) =

English cricketer

Personal information
- Full name: Alfred Barlow
- Born: 21 August 1915; Little Lever, England
- Died: 9 May 1983 (aged 67); Middleton, England
- Batting: Right-handed
- Role: Wicket-keeper

Domestic team information
- Years: Team
- 1947–1951: Lancashire
- First-class debut: 18 June 1947 Lancashire v Cambridge University
- Last First-class: 2 June 1951 Lancashire v Gloucestershire

Career statistics
Competition	First-class
Matches	85
Runs scored	863
Batting average	11.50
100s/50s	0/0
Top score	44
Balls bowled	12
Wickets	0
Bowling average	0.00
5 wickets in innings	–
10 wickets in match	–
Best bowling	0–0
Catches/stumpings	116/52
- Source: CricketArchive, 5 May 2011

Alfred Barlow (born 31 August 1915 in Little Lever, Lancashire – died 9 May 1983 in Middleton, Lancashire) was an English cricketer who played as a wicket-keeper. He played 74 first-class matches for Lancashire between 1947 and 1951, and was selected to represent the Commonwealth XI for a tour of India and Ceylon in the winter of 1950/51.
