= Jack Ikin =

English cricketer

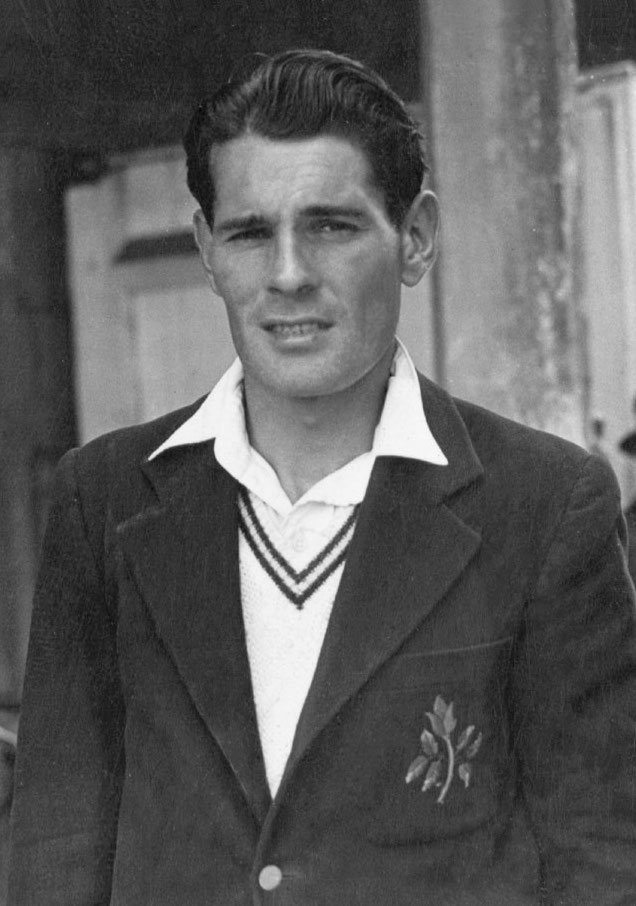
- Ikin in 1946

Personal information
- Full name: John Thomas Ikin
- Born: 7 March 1918; Bignall End, Newcastle-under-Lyme, Staffordshire
- Died: 15 September 1984 (aged 66); Bignall End
- Batting: Left-handed
- Bowling: Right-arm leg break and googly

International information
- National side: England (1946–1955)
- Test debut (cap 312): 22 June 1946 v India
- Last Test: 17 August 1955 v South Africa

Domestic team information
- Years: Team
- 1934–1968: Staffordshire
- 1939–1957: Lancashire

Career statistics
Competition	Test	FC
Matches	18	365
Runs scored	606	17,968
Batting average	20.89	36.81
100s/50s	0/3	27/108
Top score	60	192
Balls bowled	572	22,618
Wickets	3	339
Bowling average	118.00	30.27
5 wickets in innings	0	11
10 wickets in match	0	1
Best bowling	1/38	6/21
Catches/stumpings	31/–	419/–
- Source: Cricinfo, 12 May 2018

John Thomas Ikin (7 March 1918 – 15 September 1984) was an English cricketer, who played in eighteen Test matches from 1946 to 1955. A "calm, popular left-hander who also bowled leg spin", Ikin played most of his cricket for Lancashire. He was a solid left-handed batsman whose statistically modest Test record underplayed his contribution to the team as a sturdy foil to such players as Bill Edrich, Len Hutton and Denis Compton.

== Life and career ==
He played minor county cricket for Staffordshire from the age of sixteen, and appeared for Lancashire in four games in 1939, taking George Headley's wicket as the first of 339 in first-class matches. After losing perhaps his best years to World War II, during which he fought at Tobruk, he resumed his career for Lancashire in 1946 and became a mainstay of the team, recording 1,000 runs in a season eleven times. He toured Australia in the 1946–47 Ashes series, compiling an obdurate 60 at Sydney and featuring in a brave stand of 118 with Norman Yardley in Melbourne. He was involved in a pivotal incident in the first Test at Brisbane when he claimed to have caught Don Bradman at second slip for 28 from the bowling of Bill Voce, only for the umpire to rule the batsman not out. Bradman went on to make 187. Ikin went on MCC's disastrous 1947/48 tour of the West Indies under Gubby Allen and was understandably less successful, but he scored 625 runs at an average of 89.28 on the Commonwealth XI tour of India and Ceylon in 1950/51.

In Cyril Washbrook's benefit match against the 1948 Australians, Ikin had reached 90 when Bradman instructed Keith Miller to bowl. Miller refused, noting that Ikin had been a Rat of Tobruk, but his fast bowling partner Ray Lindwall denied Ikin his century, bowling him for 99. Ikin took a hat-trick against Somerset in 1949, and recorded his highest score of 192 against Oxford University in 1951. Gradually, injury and fragile health took its toll, and Ikin retired at the end of the 1957 season, with 17,968 first-class runs to his name. He resumed his minor county career with success for Staffordshire, playing on until 1968 and served as assistant manager on the 1965/66 MCC tour of Australia. nb. Jack Ikin's benefit match was against county champions Surrey in 1953.
