= Jim Cornford =

English cricketer

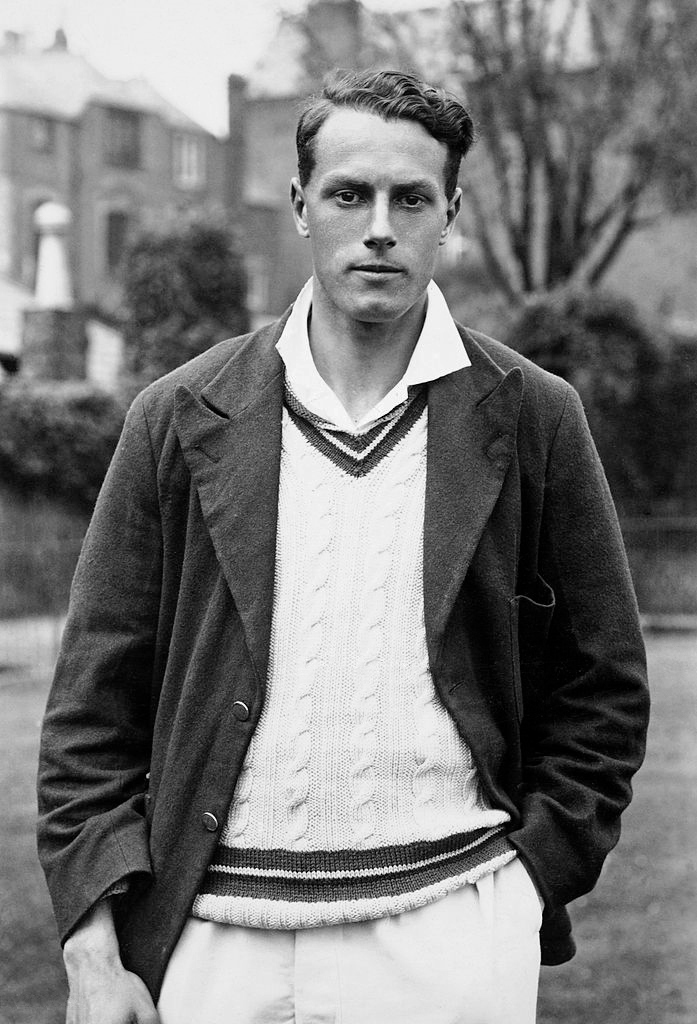

Personal information
- Full name: James Henry Cornford
- Born: 9 December 1911; Crowborough, Sussex, England
- Died: 17 June 1985 (aged 73); Harare, Zimbabwe
- Batting: Right-handed
- Bowling: Right-arm fast-medium

Domestic team information
- Years: Team
- 1931–1952: Sussex County Cricket Club

Career statistics
Competition	First-class
Matches	332
Runs scored	1,357
Batting average	5.34
100s/50s	0/0
Top score	34
Balls bowled	63,380
Wickets	1,019
Bowling average	26.49
5 wickets in innings	39
10 wickets in match	6
Best bowling	9/53
Catches/stumpings	134/–
- Source: CricInfo, 24 April 2023

James Henry Cornford (9 December 1911 – 17 June 1985) was a first-class cricketer. He was born in Sussex in 1911 and played 322 first-class matches, largely for Sussex County Cricket Club, between 1931 and 1952. A right arm fast medium bowler, he took 1019 wickets at 26.49 with a best of 9 for 53. He was very much a tail end batsman, averaging 5.34 with a best of just 34. He died in Zimbabwe in 1985.

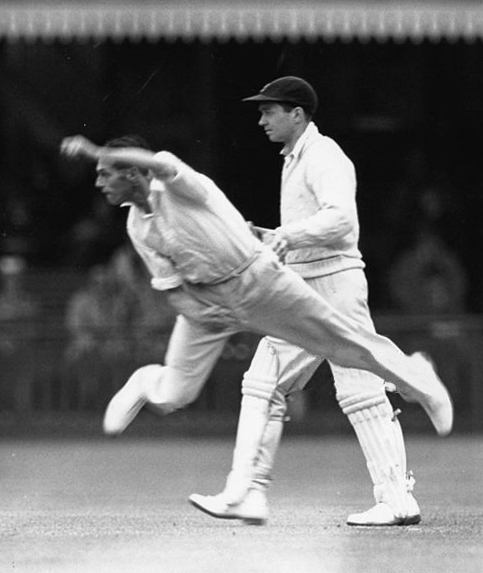
Cornford bowling in 1938
