= Paul Carey (cricketer) =

English cricketer

Paul Alexander Huntly Carey (21 May 1920 – 13 November 2009) was an English cricketer who played first-class cricket from 1943 to 1948. He was born in Horsham and died in Perth, Western Australia.

Carey appeared in 52 first-class matches as a left-handed batsman who bowled right-arm fast. He scored 869 runs with a highest score of 96 and took 136 wickets with a best performance of six for 80.

During the Second World War, Carey was stationed in India where he played 10 games of first-class cricket from 1943 to 1946. He was a member of the Baroda team that won the Ranji Trophy in 1942–43.

After returning to England he played for Sussex from 1946 to 1948. In 1947 he took 54 wickets, including a hat-trick against Glamorgan. He also played Minor Counties cricket for Dorset in 1938 and Durham in 1950 and 1951.

He migrated to Australia in 1964.
