= Harry Crabtree =

English cricketer

Personal information
- Full name: Harry Pollard Crabtree
- Born: 30 April 1906; Barnoldswick, Yorkshire, England
- Died: 28 May 1982 (aged 76); Great Baddow, Essex, England
- Batting: Right-handed
- Role: Batsman

Domestic team information
- Years: Team
- 1931–1947: Essex

Career statistics
Competition	FC
Matches	24
Runs scored	1,281
Batting average	32.02
100s/50s	4/3
Top score	146
Catches/stumpings	12/0
- Source: Cricinfo, 8 April 2022

Harry Crabtree MBE (30 April 1906 – 28 May 1982) was an English cricketer, coaching adviser and rugby player. He played for Essex between 1931 and 1947.

He was born in Barnoldswick which was then in Yorkshire. He played for Colne in the Lancashire League from 1924-1929 before making his Essex debut in 1931 whilst playing club cricket for Westcliffe-on-Sea and Barnoldswick. He only played two games returning to the fold in 1946 when he had his best season - 793 runs at an average of 49.56 including three hundreds making his career highest score of 146 against Nottinghamshire at Clacton-on-Sea. He performed more modestly in 1947 making his last first class appearance although he would play for the second team in 1948 and 1949. During the war he had played regularly for the British Empire XI scoring prolificly. He continued to play club cricket into the 1950s captaining Westcliffe-on-Sea CC.

He was married to Ida a native of Silsden, elder daughter of Timothy Jackson of Morecambe, from 1935 until his sudden death. They had three children - Rodney, Susan and Peter.

He received the MBE in 1956 for services to cricket. His citation said he was senior coaching adviser to the M.C.C. Youth Cricket Association and his method of "coaching the coaches" had won international repute, including in South Africa and the Netherlands. He was an author of coaching manuals. Previously he had been senior organiser of Physical Education at Essex County Council following studies in Denmark and teaching posts, and roles with Oxfordshire and Buckinghamshire County Councils.

He was also a successful rugby player appearing for Skipton, Richmond, East Counties and trialled for England playing for the Rest v England in 1935.
