= Phil King (cricketer) =

English cricketer

Personal information
- Full name: Benjamin Philip King
- Born: 22 April 1915; Leeds, Yorkshire, England
- Died: 31 March 1970 (aged 54); Bradford, Yorkshire, England
- Batting: Right-handed
- Role: occasional wicket-keeper

Domestic team information
- Years: Team
- 1935–1939: Worcestershire
- 1946–1947: Lancashire

Career statistics
Competition	FC
Matches	117
Runs scored	4,125
Batting average	22.05
100s/50s	6/17
Top score	145
Balls bowled	6
Wickets	0
Bowling average	–
5 wickets in innings	0
10 wickets in match	0
Best bowling	–
Catches/stumpings	53/6
- Source: , 6 August 2008

Benjamin Philip King (22 April 1915 – 31 March 1970) was an English first-class cricketer who played 117 matches either side of the Second World War, first for Worcestershire, and then – despite his Yorkshire birthplace – for Lancashire. He was capped by Worcestershire in 1938, and by Lancashire in 1946.

King made a quiet first-class debut for Worcestershire against Northamptonshire in August 1935, scoring just 3 in his only innings. He appeared twice more that season, though did nothing of note, and although he played 20 games in 1936 and 1937 he made only two half-centuries: 51 not out against Surrey in July 1936 and 50* versus Essex the following month.

1938 was a considerably more successful summer for King. He passed a thousand runs for the first time, hitting 1,178 at an average of 22.65, and scoring his maiden century, 104 against Kent at Tonbridge in June. He also made 124 against Hampshire at Worcester later in the season. On this occasion, he reached his hundred before lunch.

Although King just failed to repeat the thousand in 1939, hitting 974 runs, he scored another two hundreds that summer. In early July he took over the gloves from George Abell during the match against Surrey, and effected five dismissals. King was named as wicket-keeper in four other matches that year.

When first-class cricket resumed after the war, King offered to return to Worcestershire on condition he was paid one pound for every run over a thousand he scored, but the county refused to accept. Instead, he moved to Lancashire, for whom he had a successful 1946. He scored 1,145 runs at almost 31, and again struck two centuries. The higher of these was the career-best 145 he made versus Gloucestershire in May; he scored a hundred runs before lunch on the third day, having begun the morning on 34*.

King's final season of 1947 was not particularly successful: he made only 360 runs in 17 innings and passed 50 just twice. After that he retired from playing and took a position as a cricket and rugby league columnist with the Sunday People newspaper. In this role he twice accompanied the Great Britain team to Australia, and he was preparing for a third such tour when he died by a heart attack at the early age of 54.
