= Cyril Goodway =

English cricketer

Cyril Clement Goodway (10 July 1909 – 22 May 1991) was an English cricketer active from 1937 to 1953 who played for Warwickshire. He was born in Smethwick, Staffordshire, and died in Birmingham. He appeared in 40 first-class matches as a righthanded batsman and wicketkeeper. He scored 434 runs with a highest score of 37 not out and completed 43 catches with 22 stumpings. He was President of the Birmingham and District Cricket League in 1961.
