= Anthony Riddington =

English cricketer

Anthony Riddington (22 December 1911 – 25 February 1998) was an English cricketer who played first-class cricket for Leicestershire from 1931 to 1950. He was born and died in Countesthorpe, Leicestershire.
