= Tom Wade (cricketer) =

English cricketer

Personal information
- Full name: Thomas Henry Wade
- Born: 24 November 1910; Maldon, Essex, England
- Died: 25 July 1987 (aged 76); Colchester, Essex, England
- Batting: Left-handed
- Bowling: Right-arm off-spin
- Role: Wicketkeeper

Domestic team information
- Years: Team
- 1929 to 1950: Essex

Career statistics
Competition	First-class
Matches	321
Runs scored	5024
Batting average	14.73
100s/50s	0/15
Top score	96
Balls bowled	2669
Wickets	48
Bowling average	29.54
5 wickets in innings	1
10 wickets in match	0
Best bowling	5/64
Catches/stumpings	414/177
- Source: Cricinfo, 23 December 2021

Thomas Henry Wade (24 November 1910 – 25 July 1987) was an English cricketer who played first-class cricket for Essex from 1929 to 1950, mainly as a wicket-keeper.

Tom Wade was born in Essex and began playing for the county cricket team in 1929 as an off-spin bowler and lower-order batsman. He took 33 wickets in his first season, including his best figures of 5 for 64 in the second innings in a close victory over Somerset. He had fewer opportunities in the next few seasons, although he made his highest score of 96 against Oxford University in 1932.

He took up wicket-keeping, and soon achieved such a high standard that in 1934 he displaced Roy Sheffield as the Essex wicket-keeper. In late 1936 he was on a private visit to Australia when he was asked to keep wicket for the English touring team, which had lost its two wicket-keepers to illness and injury. He played in three matches in October and November until Les Ames returned to fitness.

Wade kept playing for Essex until fibrositis compelled him to retire in 1950. He was a popular player, and his benefit yielded nearly £4000, a record for Essex at the time.
