= George Heath (cricketer) =

English cricketer

Personal information
- Full name: George Edward Mansell Heath
- Born: 20 February 1913; Victoria Peak, British Hong Kong
- Died: 6 March 1994 (aged 81); Fareham, Hampshire, England
- Batting: Right-handed
- Bowling: Right-arm fast-medium

Domestic team information
- Years: Team
- 1937–1949: Hampshire

Career statistics
| Competition | First-class |
|---|---|
| Matches | 132 |
| Runs scored | 586 |
| Batting average | 5.58 |
| 100s/50s | –/– |
| Top score | 34* |
| Balls bowled | 24,845 |
| Wickets | 404 |
| Bowling average | 28.11 |
| 5 wickets in innings | 23 |
| 10 wickets in match | 2 |
| Best bowling | 7/49 |
| Catches/stumpings | 49/– |
- Source: Cricinfo, 20 February 2010

George Edward Mansell Heath (20 February 1913 — 6 March 1994) was an English first-class cricketer, who took over 400 wickets for Hampshire in a career spanning from 1937 to 1949, separated by the Second World War.

== Life and cricket career ==
Heath was born at Victoria Peak in British Hong Kong in February 1913. He played club cricket in the Bournemouth area, before joining the staff at Hampshire in 1934. Playing for Hampshire Club and Ground against the United Services in 1935, his first wicket on the staff was future Hampshire batsman John Manners. Heath made his first-class debut for Hampshire against Essex at Portsmouth in the 1937 County Championship. He made 23 appearances during his debut season, establishing himself in the Hampshire side with 76 wickets at an average of 22.93 with his right-arm fast-medium bowling, claiming three five wicket hauls. He gained his county cap during his debut season. He improved his returns the following season, with 97 wickets at an average of 23.77 from 29 matches, taking five wickets in an innings on five occasions. The journalist John Arlott suggested that his form in 1938 led the England selectors to seriously consider him for the 1938 Ashes Series, but ultimately he was not selected. In 1939, his bowling form fell away, with 57 wickets at an average of 34.54 from 24 matches. However, midway through the season he was hindered by a strained leg.

During the Second World War, he played in exhibition matches across Hampshire. Having lost six playing years to the war, he returned to the Hampshire side following the end of the conflict, though rarely repeated the form of his pre-war cricket. Playing eighteen times in 1946, he took 41 wickets at an average of 29.58. He made 23 appearances the following season and took 76 wickets at an average of 31.11, with six five wicket hauls; it was during the 1947 season that he took his career-best figures of 7 for 49 against Derbyshire at Portsmouth. In 1948, he took 38 wickets at an average of 31.13 from eleven matches, however, with the presence of Derek Shackleton in the Hampshire side, he made just four appearances in 1949 and subsequently retired at the end of that season. In 132 first-class appearances for Hampshire, he took 404 wickets at an average of 28.11; he took five wickets in an innings on 23 occasions and ten-wickets in a match twice. Arlott remarked that "as a shock opening bowler, he was of very high quality indeed". He was known to bowl long spells, bowling unchanged for an hour and 45 minutes against Essex in 1938.

His benefit season was held in 1951, with Heath coaching cricket to schoolboys on the playing fields near the Hilsea Lines during the early-1950s. He was the landlord of The Cricketer's Tavern in Leigh Park during the 1950s. He played club cricket for Leigh Park Cricket Club, which was based on the common opposite the tavern, and used his county contacts to arrange matches against teams led by former teammates, such as Neville Rogers. He gave up his license on The Cricketer's Tavern in September 1959, relocating to Fareham with his wife and two children. Heath died at Fareham in March 1994.
