= Tom Barling =

English cricketer

Personal information
- Full name: Henry Thomas Barling
- Born: 1 September 1906; Kensington, London
- Died: 2 January 1993 (aged 86); Hastings, Sussex
- Batting: Right-handed

Career statistics
| Competition | First-class |
|---|---|
| Matches | 391 |
| Runs scored | 19,209 |
| Batting average | 34.61 |
| 100s/50s | 34/99 |
| Top score | 269 |
| Balls bowled | 856 |
| Wickets | 7 |
| Bowling average | 78.57 |
| 5 wickets in innings | 0 |
| 10 wickets in match | 0 |
| Best bowling | 3/46 |
| Catches/stumpings | 172/– |
- Source: CricketArchive, 14 April 2023

Henry Thomas Barling (1 September 1906 – 2 January 1993) was an English cricketer. A right-handed batsman, in a first-class career with Surrey lasting from 1927 to 1948, he scored 19209 runs at an average of 34.61, with 34 hundreds and a highest score of 269.

During World War II, he served in Coastal Command of the RAF. After retiring from first-class cricket, he was a coach at Harrow School from 1948 to 1966.
