= John Hossell =

English cricketer (1914–1999)

Personal information
- Full name: John Johnson Hossell
- Born: 25 May 1914; Handsworth, Birmingham, England
- Died: 8 July 1999 (aged 85); Chipping Campden, Gloucestershire, England
- Batting: Left-handed
- Bowling: Left-arm orthodox spin
- Role: Batter

Domestic team information
- Years: Team
- 1939–1947: Warwickshire

Career statistics
Competition	First-class
Matches	35
Runs scored	1,217
Batting average	21.35
100s/50s	–/5
Top score	83
Balls bowled	704
Wickets	7
Bowling average	52.85
5 wickets in innings	–
10 wickets in match	–
Best bowling	3/24
Catches/stumpings	12/–
- Source: CricketArchive, 6 December 2024

John Johnson Hossell (25 May 1914 – 8 July 1999) was an English cricketer who played for Warwickshire from 1939 to 1947. He was born in Handsworth, Birmingham and died in Chipping Campden. He appeared in 35 first-class matches as a left-handed batsman who bowled left-arm orthodox spin. He scored 1,217 runs with a highest score of 83 and took seven wickets with a best performance of three for 24.
