= Peter Judge (cricketer) =

English cricketer

Peter Francis Judge (10 May 1916, Cricklewood, Middlesex – 4 March 1992, Camden, London) was an English cricketer. He was a right-arm fast-medium bowler and played for Middlesex and Glamorgan. In a career spanning 14 years, he appeared in 68 first-class matches. He is notable in cricket history for having recorded the fastest pair ever, at Cardiff Arms Park against the visiting Indians in 1946. He was dismissed by off the second ball he faced in the second innings, making it a pair in the space of three balls, when his captain decided to reverse the batting order, having been forced to follow on.
