= Norman Hever =

English cricketer

Norman George Hever (17 December 1924 – 11 September 1987) was an English cricketer active from 1947 to 1953 who played for Middlesex and Glamorgan. He was born in Marylebone and died in Oxford. He appeared in 144 first-class matches as a righthanded batsman who bowled right arm fast medium. He scored 896 runs with a highest score of 40 and took 333 wickets with a best performance of seven for 55.
