= William Nevell =

English cricketer

William Thomas Nevell (1916–1978) was an English cricketer active from 1936 to 1947 who played for Middlesex and Surrey before the Second World War and then for Northamptonshire in the 1946 and 1947 seasons. He appeared in 51 first-class matches as a right arm medium-fast bowler who was a righthanded batsman. Nevell was born in Balham, London on 13 June 1916 and died in Worthing, Sussex, on 25 August 1978. He took 105 first-class wickets with a best performance of four for 11 and he scored 671 runs with a highest score of 55 not out, his sole half-century.

== Sources ==
- William Nevell at CricketArchive
- William Nevell at ESPNcricinfo
- Playfair Cricket Annual – 1948 edition
