= Bill Morris (cricketer) =

English cricketer

Personal information
- Full name: William Bancroft Morris
- Born: 28 May 1917; Kingston, Jamaica
- Died: 2 March 2004 (aged 86); Kilmarnock, Ayrshire
- Batting: Right-handed
- Bowling: Leg-break
- Role: Bowler

Domestic team information
- Years: Team
- 1946–1950: Essex
- 1951–1958: Cambridgeshire

Career statistics
Competition	First-class
Matches	48
Runs scored	1,219
Batting average	17.92
100s/50s	0/5
Top score	68
Balls bowled	4,002
Wickets	43
Bowling average	45.93
5 wickets in innings	0
10 wickets in match	0
Best bowling	4/90
Catches/stumpings	18/–
- Source: Cricinfo, 16 October 2018

Bill Morris (28 May 1917 – 2 March 2004) was an English cricketer. He played for Essex between 1946 and 1950 and Cambridgeshire in the Minor Counties Championship between 1951 and 1958.
