= Alfred Barlow (American football) =

American football quarterback

Harry Barlow
Profile
- Position: Quarterback

Career information
- College: Michigan (1905)

Alfred Barlow was an American football quarterback. Barlow listed his home town as Corry, Pennsylvania and played one season of college football at the University of Michigan. He was a quarterback for the 1905 Michigan Wolverines football team, starting five games at the position.

On November 8, 1905, Barlow was Michigan's starting quarterback in a 40 to 0 victory over Ohio State. The game featured a 105-yard run by Barlow, described as "the longest ever seen on Ferry Field." Barlow returned a missed dropkick from five yards deep in Michigan's endzone. Almost tackled at the 40-yard line, Barlow was aided by his teammates' blocking and returned the ball all the way for a touchdown. The Detroit Free Press reported the length of Barlow's (described by the Free Press as "little Al Barlow") run as 110 yards and noted that "2,000 Michigan rooters rose and cheered wildly as Barlow planted ball behind the enemy's goal, after his record run."
