= Geoff Whittaker =

English cricketer

Geoffrey James Whittaker (Peckham, 29 May 1916 – St Peter, Jersey, 21 April 1997) was an English cricketer active from 1935 to 1953 who played for Surrey. He was the son of Fred Whitaker a professional footballer born in Burnley in 1888 who played for Northampton Town.

Whittaker appeared in 129 first-class matches for Surrey as a right-handed batsman who scored 4,988 runs with a highest score of 185 not out among eight centuries. His average for Surrey Second XI in the 1939 season was 100.4 in 10 matches including four not outs. He also played football for Kingstonian F.C. both before and after World War II. During the war Whittaker served in the Army and was captured at Tobruk where he lost the top of his thumb and spent 3 1/2 years as a prisoner of war. When his contract with Surrey was not renewed in 1953 he moved to Jersey to coach association football and cricket at Victoria College, Jersey and remained there after he retired.
