= George Lambert (cricketer) =

English cricketer

Personal information
- Full name: George Ernest Edward Lambert
- Born: 11 May 1919; Paddington, London, England
- Died: 30 October 1991 (aged 72); Bristol, England
- Batting: Right-handed
- Bowling: Right-arm fast-medium
- Role: All-rounder
- Relatives: Son-in-law, David Constant

Domestic team information
- Years: Team
- 1938–57: Gloucestershire
- 1960: Somerset
- First-class debut: 20 August 1938 Gloucestershire v Lancashire
- Last First-class: 3 June 1960 Somerset v Nottinghamshire

Career statistics
Competition	First-class
Matches	340
Runs scored	6375
Batting average	14.89
100s/50s	1/21
Top score	100*
Balls bowled	53006
Wickets	917
Bowling average	28.55
5 wickets in innings	37
10 wickets in match	5
Best bowling	8/35
Catches/stumpings	193/–
- Source: CricketArchive, 31 July 2011

George Ernest Edward Lambert (11 May 1919 – 30 October 1991) played in 334 first-class cricket matches for Gloucestershire between 1938 and 1957. He later became cricket coach at Somerset and played three times for the first team in an injury crisis in 1960. He was born at Paddington, London and died in Bristol.

Lambert was a right-handed lower-order batsman and a right-arm fast-medium bowler who was, in his prime, sometimes genuinely fast. Played by Gloucestershire primarily as the new-ball bowler in an attack dominated throughout his career by spin bowling, he often made useful runs and, in a side which frequently had a very long tail, often batted higher up the batting order than he might have done had he played for other teams.

== Cricket career ==
Lambert was on the Marylebone Cricket Club (MCC) ground staff at Lord's before joining Gloucestershire in 1937, making his first-class debut a year later in the match against Lancashire and taking a wicket in each innings. He became a regular member of the Gloucestershire first team in 1939, taking 74 wickets in the season, including match figures of 10 wickets for 148 in the game against Derbyshire which was lost by just one run.

Lambert returned to Gloucestershire after Second World War service and was a regular in the first team for the next 10 years, though in terms of wicket-taking he played second fiddle to spin bowlers, first Tom Goddard and Sam Cook and later, after Goddard's retirement, John Mortimore and Bryan Wells; unsurprisingly, his best seasons were the years from 1950 to 1952 in the interregnum between the Goddard era and the Mortimore era, when Gloucestershire had a more balanced attack.

In 1946, Lambert and Gloucestershire's other seam bowlers took only 95 County Championship wickets between them, against 293 for the spin bowlers, and in 1947, the county took advice from soil experts and applied "liberal" amounts of sand to its pitches to help the spin bowlers: the result was one of the most successful seasons for the county, but Goddard, with 206 Championship wickets, took more than four times as many wickets as Lambert, who had just 51 Championship victims.
