= Ken Taylor (cricketer, born 1916) =

English cricketer

Personal information
- Full name: Kenneth Alexander Taylor
- Born: 29 September 1916; Muswell Hill, Middlesex, England
- Died: 5 May 2002 (aged 85); Gamston, Nottinghamshire, England
- Batting: Right-handed
- Bowling: Right-arm medium
- Role: Batter

Domestic team information
- Years: Team
- 1946–1949: Warwickshire

Career statistics
Competition	First-class
Matches	87
Runs scored	3,145
Batting average	21.68
100s/50s	1/13
Top score	102
Balls bowled	48
Wickets	1
Bowling average	33.00
5 wickets in innings	–
10 wickets in match	–
Best bowling	1/18
Catches/stumpings	42/–
- Source: CricketArchive, 30 November 2024

Kenneth Alexander Taylor (29 September 1916 – 5 April 2002) was an English cricketer who played for Warwickshire from 1946 to 1949. He was born in Muswell Hill, Middlesex and died in Nottingham. He appeared in 87 first-class matches as a righthanded batsman who bowled very occasional right arm medium pace. He scored 3,145 runs with a highest score of 102 and took one wicket with a best performance of one for 18.
