= Sidney Smith (cricketer) =

English cricketer

Sidney Smith (14 January 1929 – 25 April 1985) was an English cricketer active from 1949 to 1956 who played for Lancashire. He was born in Heywood, Lancashire and died in Middleton, Lancashire. He appeared in 44 first-class matches as a righthanded batsman, scoring 1,117 runs with a highest score of 101*, his only first-class century, and held ten catches.
