= Jim Wood (Sussex cricketer) =

English cricketer

Douglas James Wood (19 May 1914 – 12 March 1989) was an English cricketer active from 1936 to 1955 who played for Sussex. He was born and died in Horsted Keynes. He appeared in 214 first-class matches as a righthanded batsman who bowled left-arm fast medium. He scored 1,305 runs with a highest score of 42 and took 589 wickets with a best performance of seven for 24. Wood was awarded his county cap by Sussex in 1938 and had a benefit season in 1955 which raised £4,450.
