= Ron Maudsley =

English professor of law and cricketer

Ronald Harling Maudsley (8 April 1918 – 29 September 1981) was an English professor of law who for a few seasons played first-class cricket. As a cricketer, he was a middle-order right-handed batsman and a right-arm medium-pace bowler who played for Oxford University and Warwickshire between 1946 and 1951. He was captain of Warwickshire in 1948.

Maudsley was born in Lostock Gralam, Cheshire, and educated at Malvern College and Birmingham University, and then served in the Royal Army Service Corps during World War II. After the war he gained a B.C.L. degree at Brasenose College, Oxford, in 1947, was immediately elected a Fellow, and taught there for nearly 20 years. He was Professor of Law at King's College, London, 1966–77 and at New York Law School 1977–81. He died at San Diego, California.
