= Colin Scott (cricketer) =

English cricketer

Colin James Scott (1 May 1919 – 22 November 1992) was an English cricketer who played 235 first-class matches for Gloucestershire.

He played for the county from 1938 until 1954. His career was largely undermined by the 1939–45 war gap. A right-arm medium-fast bowler and outstanding fielder, in the 1939 season he took 121 wickets at an average of 22.69 and during his career took 193 catches. He was unable to rediscover his pre-war form at the resumption of first-class cricket in 1946, and operated as a spin bowler in the 1950 and 1951 seasons.
