= Stan Squires =

English cricketer

Cricket information
- Batting: Right-handed
- Bowling: Right-arm off-break; Right-arm leg-break; Right-arm medium

Career statistics
Competition	First-class
Matches	410
Runs scored	19,186
Batting average	31.24
100s/50s	37/105
Top score	236
Balls bowled	22,743
Wickets	306
Bowling average	35.34
5 wickets in innings	7
10 wickets in match	0
Best bowling	8/52
Catches/stumpings	140/–
- Source: CricketArchive, 14 April 2023

Harry Stanley Squires (22 February 1909 – 24 January 1950) was an English cricketer. He was primarily a notably stylish right-handed batsman, but was also a useful right-arm off break and, later in his career, leg break bowler, as well as being a fine fielder.

Squires was born in Kingston upon Thames, Surrey on 22 February 1909. He played first-class cricket for Surrey from 1928 to 1949, the first two seasons as an amateur and subsequently as a professional. During that time he played in 410 first-class matches, all but eight of them for Surrey. He scored 19186 runs at an average of 31.24, with 37 hundreds and a highest score of 236 against Lancashire at The Oval in 1933. He took 306 wickets at 35.34, with best innings figures of 8/52. During his career he wore first spectacles and then contact lenses. His Wisden obituary said that "no more popular player wore the Surrey colours".

During World War II he served with the Royal Air Force, reaching the rank of Flying Officer. Subsequently, he ran a pub.

Squires died in Old Deer Park, Richmond on 24 January 1950, at the age of 40. He was playing as well as ever in the season prior to his death, scoring 1,785 runs at 37.18. Shortly before his fatal illness, caused by a blood virus, he won a golf foursome competition for his club, Fulwell. He was also a boxer, and played squash, rugby union and football.
