= Vista Road Recreation Ground =

Cricket ground in Clacton-on-Sea, Essex, England

Coordinates: 51.798°N 1.160°E

- Interactive map of Vista Road Recreation Ground

Ground information
- Location: Clacton-on-Sea, Essex
- Country: England
- Establishment: 1931 (first recorded match)

Team information
Essex	(1931–1966)
- As of 11 September 2010; Source: CricketArchive

Vista Road Recreation Ground is a cricket ground in Clacton-on-Sea, Essex. Its first recorded first-class cricket match was in 1931 when Essex County Cricket Club played there against Lancashire. Essex played a total of 60 first-class matches on the ground between 1931 and 1966, playing their final first-class match there versus Leicestershire in the 1966 County Championship.

Vista Road has also held five Second XI fixtures between 1948 and 1952 for the Essex 2nd XI in the Minor Counties Championship.

In local cricket, the ground hosts Clacton Cricket Club, of which Nigel Farage is a supporter.

== See also ==
- Clacton-on-Sea
- Essex County Cricket Club
