= Basil Allen =

English cricketer

Personal information
- Full name: Basil Oliver Allen
- Born: 13 October 1911; Clifton, Bristol, England
- Died: 1 May 1981 (aged 69); Wells, Somerset, England
- Batting: Left-handed
- Role: Batsman

Domestic team information
- Years: Team
- 1932–1951: Gloucestershire
- 1932–1933: Cambridge University
- FC debut: 21 May 1932 Cambridge University v Middlesex
- Last FC: 29 August 1951 Gloucestershire v Yorkshire

Career statistics
Competition	First-class
Matches	308
Runs scored	14,195
Batting average	28.85
100s/50s	14/83
Top score	220
Balls bowled	448
Wickets	3
Bowling average	143.00
5 wickets in innings	0
10 wickets in match	0
Best bowling	2/80
Catches/stumpings	310/–
- Source: CricketArchive, 21 August 2007

Basil Oliver Allen (13 October 1911 – 1 May 1981) was an English first-class cricketer.

Allen was educated at Clifton College and Caius College, Cambridge. A left-handed batsman and fine close fieldsman, he played for Cambridge University Cricket Club in 1932 and 1933. He then enjoyed a long county career as an amateur for Gloucestershire from 1932 to 1951, captaining the county in 1937 and 1938 and from 1947 to 1950. He also played first-class matches for Marylebone Cricket Club from 1936 to 1939 and the Gentlemen in 1938.

Allen scored 14 first-class hundreds, with his only double century, 220, coming against Hampshire in 1947. His best season was 1938, when he scored 1785 runs at an average of 34.32.
