= Jim Eaglestone =

English cricketer

Personal information
- Full name: James Thomas Eaglestone
- Born: 24 July 1923; Paddington, London, England
- Died: 14 October 2000 (aged 77); Pinner, London, England
- Batting: Left-handed
- Role: Batsman

Domestic team information
- Years: Team
- 1947: Middlesex
- 1948–1949: Glamorgan

Career statistics
Competition	First-class
Matches	60
Runs scored	1420
Batting average	15.77
100s/50s	0/7
Top score	77
Catches/stumpings	23/–
- Source: CricInfo, 12 June 2013

James Thomas Eaglestone (24 July 1923 – 14 October 2000) was an English cricketer who played 60 first-class cricket matches, initially for Middlesex in 1947, before moving to Glamorgan for the 1948 and 1949 seasons. Known largely for his skills as a fielder – for he found only moderate success with the bat – Eaglestone enjoys the unusual distinction of having featured in two different County Championship-winning sides in consecutive seasons.

== Career ==
Eaglestone was drawn to cricket after leaving school in 1938 when he joined the groundstaff at Lord's Cricket Ground. He played for the Middlesex Second XI that year. A left-handed batsman, Eaglestone enjoyed limited success after a promising debut first-class game for the Marylebone Cricket Club in which he scored 77 in a 128-run partnership with Denis Compton. Having securing selection for Middlesex, he scored zero in his first outing for the county side, and though he made 55 in his next game he would score only seven half-centuries during his career and finish with a batting average of 15.77.

Eaglestone played only seven matches for Middlesex in that solitary season for the club, scoring 151 runs. He decided to move to Glamorgan at the end of that year's County Championship – of which Middlesex were crowned champions. He played for Glamorgan in the 1948 season, and Glamorgan were victorious in that year's County Championship also – their maiden County Championship victory. This meant that Eaglestone had featured in Championship winning teams for two successive summers. His own contributions, however, were relatively modest. He scored 595 runs at 18.59 in the 1948 season and 341 runs at 11.36 in 1949.

Eaglestone was acknowledged as a highly skilled and valued fielder. Wilf Wooller, his Glamorgan captain, noted his fearless fielding close to the wicket. Wisden in their obituary of Eaglestone praised his "razor-sharp fielding" and claimed that "it was Jimmy's abilities in the field that largely won him a regular place", and with his inclusion "Glamorgan could boast having the finest fielding side in the country".

Eaglestone retired from the game in 1949 to run a newsagent's in Paddington, London. His death in 2000 followed a short illness.
