= George Watson (cricketer, born 1907) =

English cricketer and footballer

Personal information
- Full name: George Sutton Watson
- Born: 10 April 1907; Milton Regis, Kent, England
- Died: 1 April 1974 (aged 66); Guildford, Surrey, England
- Batting: Right-handed
- Bowling: Left-arm medium
- Role: Batsman

Domestic team information
- Years: Team
- 1928–1929: Kent
- 1935–1950: Leicestershire

Career statistics
Competition	First-class
Matches	236
Runs scored	8,566
Batting average	22.96
100s/50s	5/52
Top score	145
Balls bowled	36
Wickets	1
Bowling average	51.00
5 wickets in innings	0
10 wickets in match	0
Best bowling	1/21
Catches/stumpings	87/–
- Source: CricInfo, 21 May 2012

George Sutton Watson (10 April 1907 – 1 April 1974) was an English cricketer and footballer.

Born in Milton Regis in Kent, Watson was educated at Shrewsbury School. He appeared in eight first-class games for Kent's First XI between 1928 and 1929, having played for the Second XI since 1926. He played the vast majority of his cricket instead for Leicestershire - 225 appearances and over 8000 runs as a professional. His 1973 obituary in Wisden described him as "an attacking bat and a glorious field." His right-handed batting brought him five centuries for Leicestershire, and he took a single wicket with very occasional left-arm medium pace bowling.

A keen footballer, he also played twice for England in 1930 as an amateur, and played for Charlton Athletic, Maidstone United, Crystal Palace, Nuneaton Town and Gloucester City.

He died in Guildford, Surrey, in 1974.

== Bibliography ==
- Carlaw, Derek (2020). Kent County Cricketers, A to Z: Part Two (1919–1939) (PDF). Cardiff: ACS.
