= Alfred Wilcox (cricketer) =

English cricketer

Personal information
- Full name: Alfred George Sidney Wilcox
- Born: 10 July 1920; Cheltenham, Gloucestershire, England
- Died: 30 July 1986 (aged 66); Cheltenham, Gloucestershire, England
- Batting: Left-handed
- Role: Batsman

Domestic team information
- Years: Team
- 1939–1949: Gloucestershire

Career statistics
Competition	FC
Matches	39
Runs scored	835
Batting average	15.75
100s/50s	0/4
Top score	73
Catches/stumpings	21/–
- Source: Cricinfo, 5 June 2023

Alfred George Sidney Wilcox (10 July 1920 – 30 July 1986) was an English cricketer. He played 39 first-class matches for Gloucestershire between 1939 and 1949.

Wilcox was a left-handed batsman. His performances for Cheltenham Cricket Club caught the attention of Gloucestershire when he was in his teens. He played one first-class match in 1939, and resumed after World War II, playing four seasons in the late 1940s without establishing himself in the Gloucestershire team. He scored 27 and 73, his top score, in the match against Hampshire in July 1948. He was more successful for the Gloucestershire Second XI, scoring four centuries in 35 matches between 1939 and 1950.
