= Harry Crick =

English cricketer

Harry Crick (29 January 1910 – 10 February 1960) was an English first-class cricketer, who played eleven matches for Yorkshire between 1937 and 1947.

Born in Ecclesall, Sheffield, Yorkshire, England, Crick, like many cricketers of that time, lost his best years to World War II. He served in the RAF, rising to the rank of Flight Lieutenant, and took part in more than 70 bombing sorties. He returned to the RAF as a recruiting officer after the end of his cricket career.

Crick also played cricket for the Combined Services in 1947, and scored 65 opening the innings for the RAF against the Army at Lord's in 1946. He kept wicket quite regularly for the Yorkshire Second XI during his career, and played for the South of England and Maurice Leyland's XI in 1947. He was a wicket-keeper who took 20 catches and completed eight stumpings. He was hampered in his first-class career by a lack of success with the bat, scoring just 124 runs at an average of 9.53, with a best score of 22.

Crick died in a car crash in February 1960 in Lower Wyke, Bradford, aged 50. He died the same day as Ted Brooks, the Surrey wicket-keeper, against whom he had played in Arthur Mitchell's benefit match in 1937.
