= Alec Thompson =

English cricketer

Alexander William Thompson (1916–2001) was an English cricketer active from 1939 to 1955 who played for Middlesex in 202 matches as a right-handed batsman and occasional off-spinner.

== Notable Achievements ==
- Thompson scored 7,915 runs in first-class cricket with a highest score of 158, one of five centuries.
- Thompson was awarded his county cap in 1946.
- In 1947, he was a member of the Middlesex team that won the County Championship.

== Early life ==
Thompson was born in Toxteth Park, Liverpool, on 17 April 1916.

== Death ==
Thompson died in Illinois on 13 January 2001.

== Sources ==
- Alec Thompson at Cricinfo
- Alec Thompson at CricketArchive (subscription required)
- Playfair Cricket Annual – 1948 edition
