= Wagon Works Ground =

Cricket ground in Gloucester, England

Coordinates: 51.8448°N 2.2501°W

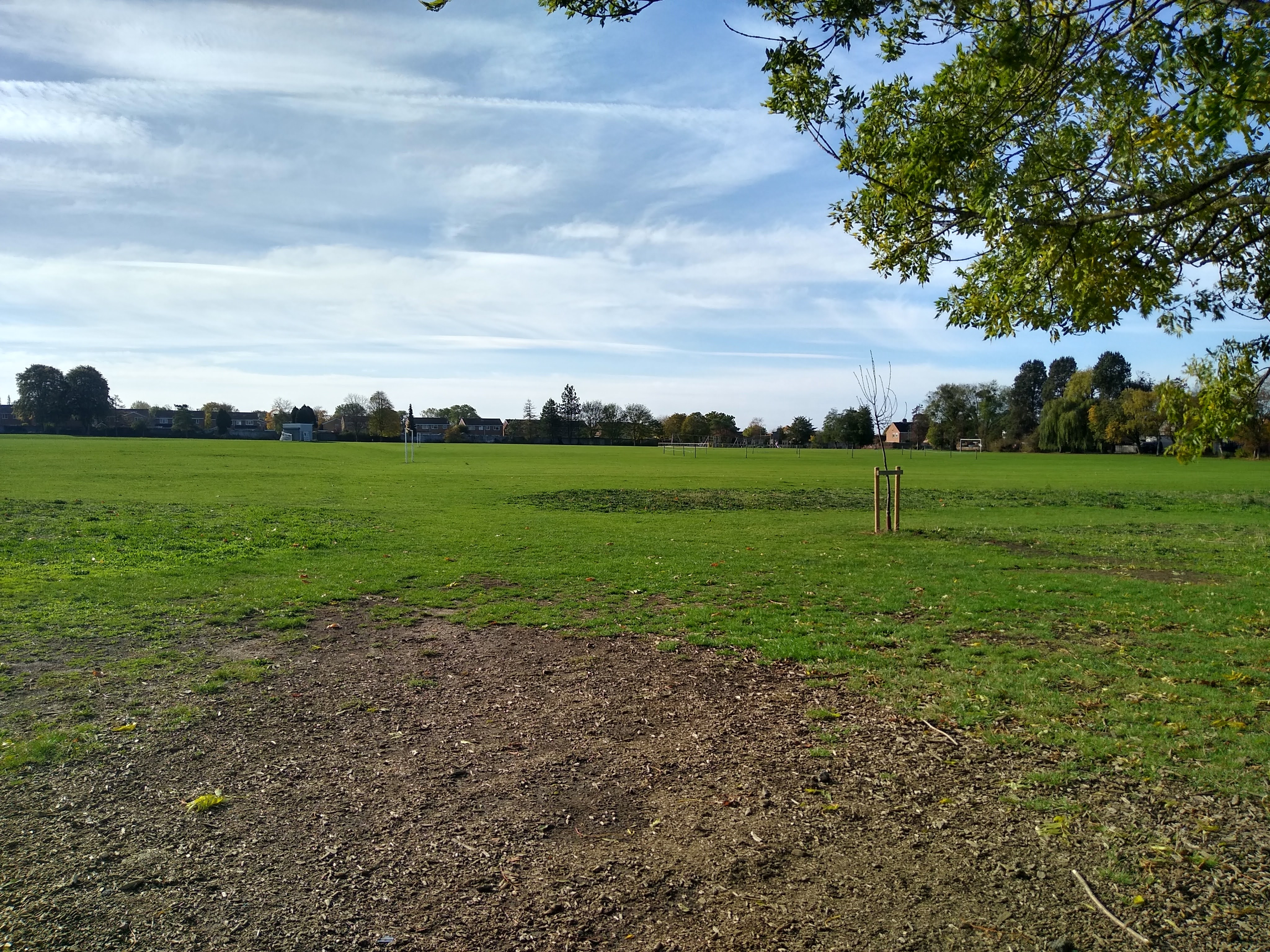
- Wagon Works Ground in 2022
- Interactive map of Wagon Works Ground

Ground information
- Location: Gloucester, Gloucestershire
- Country: England
- Establishment: 1878

Team information
Gloucestershire	(1923-1992)
- As of 10 September 2010; Source: Ground profile

Wagon Works Ground is a cricket ground in Gloucester, Gloucestershire. The ground was owned by the Gloucester Railway Carriage and Wagon Company.

== History ==
The first recorded match on the ground was in 1923, when Gloucestershire played Lancashire in the grounds first first-class match. Gloucestershire played first-class matches at the ground from 1923 to 1992, playing a total of 155 first-class matches there, the last of which saw them play Somerset in the 1992 County Championship. One innings of note came in 1936, when Wally Hammond made 317 of Gloucestershire's 485 against Nottinghamshire.

As well as hosting first-class cricket the ground has also hosted List-A matches. The first List-A match held there came in the 1969 Player's County League when Gloucestershire played Yorkshire. From 1969 to 1992, Gloucestershire played 27 List-A matches there, the last of which saw them play Somerset in the 1992 Sunday League.

The ground has also played host to 6 matches involving the Gloucestershire Second XI in the Second XI Championship and Second XI Trophy.

The ground is still used for cricket today as well as football. Following the rejection of Gloucestershire's plans to redevelop the County Ground in Bristol, Gloucester City Council contacted Gloucestershire over a potential move back to the ground, which would see it redeveloped and become Gloucestershire's permanent home ground.
