= Kenneth Fiddling =

English cricketer

Ken Fiddling
Personal information
- Full name: Kenneth Fiddling
- Born: 13 October 1917; Hebden Bridge, Yorkshire, England
- Died: 19 June 1992 (aged 74); Halifax, West Yorkshire, England
- Batting: Right-handed
- Role: Wicketkeeper

Domestic team information
- Years: Team
- 1938–1946: Yorkshire
- 1947–1953: Northamptonshire

Career statistics
Competition	First-class
Matches	160
Runs scored	1,380
Batting average	11.69
100s/50s	–/1
Top score	68
Catches/stumpings	227/76
- Source: CricketArchive, 5 December 2024

Kenneth Fiddling (13 October 1917 – 19 June 1992) was a first-class cricketer whose career spanned the 1938 to 1953 seasons.

Born in Hebden Bridge, Yorkshire, England, Fiddling was a professional who played 18 games for Yorkshire from 1938 to 1946, and 142 for Northants from 1947 to 1953. A specialist wicket-keeper, he was a lower-order right-handed batsman, scoring 1,380 runs at 11.69, with a best score of 68 for Northants against Surrey. His career was finished by ill health.

Fiddling died in Halifax, West Yorkshire, in June 1992.
