= George Lavis =

Welsh cricketer

George Lavis (17 August 1908 – 29 July 1956) was a Welsh cricketer active from 1928 to 1950 who played for Glamorgan. He was born in Monmouth and died in Pontypool. He appeared in 206 first-class matches as a righthanded batsman who bowled right arm medium fast. He scored 4,961 runs with a highest score of 154 among three centuries and took 156 wickets with a best performance of four for 55.
