= Eric Price (cricketer) =

English cricketer

Personal information
- Full name: Eric James Price
- Born: 27 October 1918; Middleton, Lancashire, England
- Died: 13 July 2002 (aged 83); Rochdale, Lancashire, England
- Batting: Left-handed
- Role: Bowler

Domestic team information
- Years: Team
- 1946–1947: Lancashire
- 1948–1949: Essex

Career statistics
Competition	FC
Matches	80
Runs scored	558
Batting average	8.71
100s/50s	0/1
Top score	54
Balls bowled	12432
Wickets	215
Bowling average	26.61
5 wickets in innings	10
10 wickets in match	2
Best bowling	8/125
Catches/stumpings	40/0
- Source: Cricinfo, 19 July 2013

Eric Price (27 October 1918 – 13 July 2002) was an English first-class cricketer. He played for Lancashire between 1946 and 1947 and for Essex between 1948 and 1949.
