= Len Muncer =

English cricketer

Cricket information
- Batting: Right-handed
- Bowling: Right-arm leg-spin

Career statistics
Competition	First-class
Matches	317
Runs scored	8,646
Batting average	20.88
100s/50s	4/30
Top score	135
Balls bowled	41,660
Wickets	755
Bowling average	20.90
5 wickets in innings	44
10 wickets in match	8
Best bowling	9/62
Catches/stumpings	145/–
- Source: CricketArchive, 8 November 2022

Bernard Leonard Muncer (23 October 1913 – 18 January 1982) was a cricketer who played for Middlesex and Glamorgan.

Muncer was a useful middle or later order right-handed batsman and a spin bowler who began by bowling occasional leg breaks and googlies for Middlesex in the 1930s but converted to off-spin when he changed counties to Glamorgan.

== Career ==
Muncer's first-class cricket career divides into two almost exact halves. For eight seasons with Middlesex, starting in 1933, he was regarded as a batsman who bowled infrequently, and though he played regularly in 1934 and 1935, he was a fringe first eleven player for his remaining seasons with the county. In eight seasons, he made only just over 2000 runs and took 23 wickets. The eight seasons were divided by the Second World War, in which he was a prisoner of war in the Far East and worked on the Burma-Siam railway.

But recruited by Glamorgan captain Wilf Wooller on special registration in 1947 and converted to off-spin, Muncer proved both a reliable batsman and a penetrative bowler. In his first season with the Welsh county, he scored 689 runs and took 107 wickets, including nine for 97 in an innings against Surrey at Cardiff, which was more wickets in an innings than he had taken in a full season before.

The following year, 1948, Muncer's 159 wickets played a large part in winning the County Championship for Glamorgan for the first time, and he finished high up the national bowling averages. Against Essex at Brentwood, he took nine wickets for 62 runs in an innings and 15 for 161 in the match, and these remained the best innings and match figures of his career. He also took 15 wickets in the match against Sussex at Swansea.

Over the next four seasons, Muncer took more than 100 wickets each year except in 1950, when Glamorgan set a record with nine matches that failed to be decided even on first innings because of the weather. And his batting continued to develop, with one century in every season from 1950 to 1953 and, in 1952, a tally of 1097 runs to go with 105 wickets for the all-rounder's double.

In 1953, his bowling was hampered by injury, and Jim McConnon became the county's main off-spin bowler. He retired after the 1954 season, in which he was awarded a benefit, having played eight seasons in all for Glamorgan.

After his playing career ended he returned to Lord's and was head coach of the Marylebone Cricket Club (MCC) from 1964 until he retired in 1978. In 1971 he was awarded a second benefit, jointly with Harry Sharp, former Middlesex batsman and then scorer, who was his assistant head coach at MCC.
