= Eric Meads =

English cricketer

Personal information
- Full name: Eric Alfred Meads
- Born: 17 August 1916; Carrington, Nottinghamshire, England
- Died: 23 June 2006 (aged 89); Cinderhill, Nottinghamshire, England
- Batting: Right-handed
- Role: Wicketkeeper

Domestic team information
- Years: Team
- 1939–1953: Nottinghamshire

Career statistics
Competition	First-class
Matches	205
Runs scored	1,475
Batting average	9.83
100s/50s	–/2
Top score	56*
Catches/stumpings	366/80
- Source: CricketArchive, 7 December 2024

Eric Alfred Meads (17 August 1916 – 23 June 2006) was an English cricketer who played for Nottinghamshire from 1939 to 1953. He was born and died in Nottingham. He appeared in 205 first-class matches as a right-handed batsman and wicketkeeper. He scored 1,475 runs with a highest score of 56 not out and claimed 446 victims including 80 stumpings.
