= Ray Dovey =

English cricketer

Personal information
- Full name: Raymond Randall Dovey
- Born: 18 July 1920; Chislehurst, Kent
- Died: 27 December 1974 (aged 54); Tunbridge Wells, Kent
- Batting: Left-handed
- Bowling: Right-arm off-break
- Role: Bowler

Domestic team information
- Years: Team
- 1938–1954: Kent
- 1955–1959: Dorset
- FC debut: 9 July 1938 Kent v Surrey
- Last FC: 25 August 1954 Kent v Pakistanis

Career statistics
Competition	First-class
Matches	263
Runs scored	3,481
Batting average	11.63
100s/50s	0/5
Top score	65*
Balls bowled	55,405
Wickets	777
Bowling average	27.53
5 wickets in innings	25
10 wickets in match	2
Best bowling	8/23
Catches/stumpings	79/–
- Source: CricInfo, 7 March 2018

Raymond Randall Dovey (18 July 1920 – 27 December 1974), known as Ray Dovey, was an English cricketer who played for Kent County Cricket Club from 1938 to 1954.

Dovey was born in Chislehurst in Kent in 1920 and first played for Kent before the Second World War as an off-break bowler. He made his debut for Kent's Second XI in 1936 before making his first-class cricket debut in 1938 against Surrey at Rectory Field, Blackheath. He played for Kent until 1954, making a total of 249 appearances for the Kent First XI before and after the war. Dovey was awarded his county cap in 1946 and was used as a "stock bowler" by Kent. He has been described as a "more than useful off-spinner" who was "reliable".

As well as spinning the ball he could also bowl effective medium-pace deliveries and turned the ball sharply, especially on damp pitches. Dovey took career best bowling figures of eight wickets for 23 runs on such a pitch in 1950 against Surrey, taking 102 wickets for Kent during the season.

Dovey toured India and Ceylon with a Commonwealth cricket team in 1950–51, playing in 10 first-class matches on the tour, and took a total of 777 first-class wickets in his career. He played minor matches for Glamorgan during the war and made his final first class appearance for Kent against the touring Pakistanis in August 1954.

After retiring from first-class cricket Dovey coached cricket at Sherborne School in Dorset, playing Minor Counties Championship cricket for Dorset County Cricket Club from 1955 to 1959. He made 57 Championship appearances for the county team before returning to Kent to work at Tonbridge School where he was involved with developing young cricketers including Christopher Cowdrey. Dovey died suddenly at Tunbridge Wells in Kent in December 1974 aged 54.

== Bibliography ==
- Carlaw, Derek (2020). Kent County Cricketers, A to Z: Part Two (1919–1939) (PDF). Cardiff: ACS.
