= Arnold Dyson =

English cricketer

Cricket information
- Batting: Right-handed
- Bowling: Right-arm medium

Career statistics
Competition	First-class
Matches	413
Runs scored	17,923
Batting average	27.15
100s/50s	24/92
Top score	208
Balls bowled	195
Wickets	1
Bowling average	160.00
5 wickets in innings	0
10 wickets in match	0
Best bowling	1/9
Catches/stumpings	243/1
- Source: CricketArchive, 16 April 2023

Arnold Herbert Dyson (10 July 1905 – 7 June 1978) was an English first-class cricketer who played for Glamorgan.

Dyson was born in Halifax, Yorkshire and played as a right-handed opening batsman, often partnering Emrys Davies. A consistent batsman, he passed 1,000 runs in all but one season from 1931 until 1947. During this time he set a record for 305 consecutive appearances in the County Championship.
