= Arthur Porter (cricketer) =

English cricketer

Arthur Porter (25 March 1914 – 20 February 1994) was an English cricketer active from 1947 to 1956 who played for Glamorgan. He was born in Clayton-le-Moors and died in Newport, Monmouthshire. He appeared in 38 first-class matches as a righthanded batsman who bowled right arm medium pace and off breaks. He scored 1,292 runs with a highest score of 105 among two centuries and took sixteen wickets with a best performance of four for 25.
