= English cricket team in India, Pakistan and Ceylon in 1951–52 =

International cricket tour

England in India 1951-52
	India	England
- Dates: 5 October 1951 – 2 March 1952
Captains	Vijay Hazare	Nigel Howard; Donald Carr (5th Test)

Test series
- Result: 5-match series drawn 1–1
Most runs	Pankaj Roy (387)	Allan Watkins (450)
Most wickets	Vinoo Mankad (34)	Roy Tattersall (21)

A cricket team from England organised by the Marylebone Cricket Club (MCC) toured India from 5 October 1951 to 2 March 1952. During this tour England team also played first class matches in Pakistan and Ceylon. In the Test matches, the side was known as "England"; in other matches, it was known as "MCC".

The Test series was drawn 1-1, with three matches being drawn.

== Background ==
It was reported in April 1950 that the MCC would tour India, Pakistan and Ceylon in the 1951–52 season. The squad would play games over three and a half months in India, over a month in Pakistan and over fifteen days in Ceylon.

== The English team ==
- Nigel Howard (captain)
- Donald Carr (vice-captain)
- Don Brennan
- Tom Graveney
- Malcolm Hilton
- Don Kenyon
- Eddie Leadbeater
- Frank Lowson
- Cyril Poole
- Dusty Rhodes
- Fred Ridgway
- Jack Robertson
- Derek Shackleton
- Dick Spooner
- Brian Statham
- Roy Tattersall
- Allan Watkins

The manager was Geoffrey Howard. The team was announced in late July 1951. Poole replaced Jack Ikin, who was injured, before the team left. Leadbeater replaced Rhodes, who was forced to return home with an injury, early in the tour.

Many of England's leading players made themselves unavailable for the tour, and the resultant team was widely regarded as a "second team". Eight of the touring team – Howard, Carr, Leadbeater, Kenyon, Poole, Rhodes, Ridgway and Spooner – had no Test experience, while none of the team had played more than nine Tests. Only Statham and Tattersall had toured Australia and New Zealand in the Test series of 1950–51.

== Test matches ==
=== 1st Test ===
2–7 November 1951
Scorecard

England	v	India
203 (102.3 overs); Jack Robertson 50; Sadu Shinde 6/91 (35.3 overs)		418/6d (175 overs); Vijay Hazare 164*; Roy Tattersall 2/95 (53 overs)
368/6 (221 overs); Allan Watkins 137; Vinoo Mankad 4/58 (76 overs)

Match drawn
Feroz Shah Kotla Stadium, Delhi
Umpires: Balkrishna Mohoni and Mysore Vijayasarathi

- England won the toss and elected to bat.
- Pankaj Roy and Nana Joshi (Ind), and Don Kenyon, Donald Carr, Dick Spooner, Nigel Howard and Fred Ridgway (Eng) made their Test debuts.
- 5 November was a rest day.

=== 2nd Test ===
14–19 December 1951
Scorecard

India	v	England
485/9d (139 overs); Vijay Hazare 155; Brian Statham 4/96 (29 overs)		456 (207.1 overs); Tom Graveney 175; Vinoo Mankad 4/91 (57 overs)
208 (83.1 overs); CD Gopinath 42; Allan Watkins 3/20 (13 overs)		55/2 (36 overs); Tom Graveney 25; CD Gopinath 1/11 (8 overs)

Match drawn
Brabourne Stadium, Bombay
Umpires: M. M. Naidu and Jamshed Patel

- India won the toss and elected to bat
- CD Gopinath and Madhav Mantri (Ind), and Eddie Leadbeater (Eng) made their Test debuts.
- 17 December was a rest day.

=== 3rd Test ===
30 December–4 January 1952
Scorecard

England	v	India
342 (159.5 overs); Dick Spooner 71; Vinoo Mankad 4/89 (52.5 overs)		344 (149.1 overs); Dattu Phadkar 115; Fred Ridgway 4/83 (38.1 overs)
252/5d (120 overs); Dick Spooner 92; Ramesh Divecha 2/55 (25 overs)		103/0 (29 overs); Vinoo Mankad 71; Roy Tattersall 0/4 (4 overs)

Match drawn
Eden Gardens, Calcutta
Umpires: Bapu Joshi and Balkrishna Mohoni

- England won the toss and elected to bat.
- Buck Divecha, Subhash Gupte and Vijay Manjrekar (Ind), and Cyril Poole (Eng) made their Test debuts.
- 2 January was a rest day.

=== 4th Test ===
12–14 January 1952
Scorecard

India	v	England
121 (61.5 overs); Pankaj Roy 37; Roy Tattersall 6/48 (21 overs)		203 (95.1 overs); Allan Watkins 66; Ghulam Ahmed 5/70 (37.1 overs)
157 (66.5 overs); Hemu Adhikari 60; Malcolm Hilton 5/61 (32 overs)		76/2 (19.2 overs); Tom Graveney 48; Ghulam Ahmed 1/10 (10 overs)

England won by 8 wickets
Green Park Stadium, Kanpur
Umpires: Jamshed Patel and Mysore Vijayasarathi

- India won the toss and elected to bat.

=== 5th Test ===
6–10 February 1952
Scorecard

England	v	India
266 (121.5 overs); Jack Robertson 77; Vinoo Mankad 8/55 (38.5 overs)		457/9d (153 overs); Polly Umrigar 130; Donald Carr 2/84 (19 overs)
183 (75.5 overs); Jack Robertson 56; Vinoo Mankad 4/53 (30.5 overs)

India won by an innings and 8 runs
Madras Cricket Club Ground, Chepauk, Madras
Umpires: Balkrishna Mohoni and Mysore Vijayasarathi

- England won the toss and elected to bat.
- 7 February was a rest day because of the death of King George VI being announced during the afternoon of Day 1.

This was India's first Test victory, after 20 years and 25 Tests.
