= List of England Test cricketers =

This is a list of England Test cricketers. A Test match is an international two-innings per team cricket match between two of the leading cricketing nations. The list is arranged in the order in which each player won his Test cap by playing for the England cricket team. Where more than one player won his first Test cap in the same Test match, those players are listed alphabetically by surname. The cap numbers correspond to a player's position in the chronological list of English Test cricketers. Players have this number displayed on their kit.

Statistics are correct as of 12 September 2026 after the third Test of the series against Pakistan.

== Key ==
**General**

- ‡ – Captain
- † – Wicket-keeper
- **First** – Year of Test debut for England
- **Last** – Year of latest Test for England
- **Mat** – Number of Test appearances for England

**Batting**

- **Runs** – Runs scored in career
- **HS** – Highest score
- **Avg** – Runs scored per dismissal
- * – Batsman remained not out

**Bowling**

- **Balls** – Balls bowled in career
- **Wkt** – Wickets taken in career
- **BBI** – Best bowling in an innings
- **Ave** – Average runs per wicket

**Fielding**

- **Ca** – Catches taken
- **St** – Stumpings effected

Players in Bold are still active in Test cricket and have played for England in the format in the last year.

== Early years: 1877–1889 ==
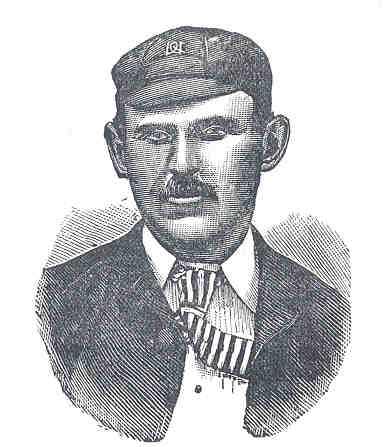
Arthur Shrewsbury (35) who was a leading figure in organising tours to Australia.

The early years of Test cricket saw a number of tours to Australia. Most of these tours were professional in nature, and as the sea voyage was around 42 days, the tours lasted many months, and the teams were selected as much on availability as on cricketing aptitude. As a result of this, coupled with there only being a small number of Tests being played, there are many early cricketers with Test records of only a few matches.

The key players who had their Test debut during this period include the great professional all-rounders George Ulyett (11), who played 25 Tests, and Billy Barnes (21), who played 21. England's Champion cricketer WG Grace (24) first played Test cricket in 1880. Although Test match cricket had not been invented in his heyday of the late 1860s and 1870s, he continued playing into his fifties, finally retiring from Test cricket at the turn of the century. Shrewsbury (35) and Stoddart (56) go down amongst the great captains of the period, as well as two of the many cricketing suicides. Johnny Briggs (47), who, bedevilled by mental illness, died young, notched up the most Test caps of the earliest era of Test match cricket.

England Test cricketers who made their debut between 1877 and 1889
Cap	Name	First	Last	Mat	Runs	HS	Avg	Balls	Wkt	BBI	Ave	Ca	St	Ref(s)
Cap	Name	First	Last	Mat	Batting			Bowling				Fielding		Ref(s)
1	Tom Armitage	1877	1877	2	33	21	11.00	12	0	–	–	0	0	
2	Henry Charlwood	1877	1877	2	63	36	15.75	0	–	–	–	0	0	
3	Tom Emmett	1877	1882	7	160	48	13.33	728	9	7/68	31.55	9	0	
4	Andrew Greenwood	1877	1877	2	77	49	19.25	0	–	–	–	2	0	
5	Allen Hill	1877	1877	2	101	49	50.50	340	7	4/27	18.57	1	0	
6	Harry Jupp	1877	1877	2	68	63	17.00	0	–	–	–	2	0	
7	James Lillywhite ‡	1877	1877	2	16	10	8.00	340	8	4/70	15.75	1	0	
8	John Selby †	1877	1882	6	256	70	23.27	0	–	–	–	1	0	
9	Alfred Shaw ‡	1877	1882	7	111	40	10.09	1,096	12	5/38	23.75	4	0	
10	James Southerton	1877	1877	2	7	6	3.50	263	7	4/46	15.28	2	0	
11	George Ulyett	1877	1890	25	949	149	24.33	2,627	50	7/36	20.40	19	0	
12	Charlie Absolom	1879	1879	1	58	52	29.00	0	–	–	–	0	0	
13	George Harris ‡	1879	1884	4	145	52	29.00	32	0	–	–	2	0	
14	Leland Hone †	1879	1879	1	13	7	6.50	0	–	–	–	2	0	
15	A. N. Hornby ‡	1879	1884	3	21	9	3.50	28	1	1/0	0.00	0	0	
16	A. P. Lucas	1879	1884	5	157	55	19.62	120	0	–	–	1	0	
17	Francis MacKinnon	1879	1879	1	5	5	2.50	0	–	–	–	0	0	
18	Vernon Royle	1879	1879	1	21	18	10.50	16	0	–	–	2	0	
19	Sandford Schultz	1879	1879	1	20	20	20.00	34	1	1/16	26.00	0	0	
20	A. J. Webbe	1879	1879	1	4	4	2.00	0	–	–	–	2	0	
21	Billy Barnes	1880	1890	21	725	134	23.38	2,289	51	6/28	15.54	19	0	
22	E. M. Grace	1880	1880	1	36	36	18.00	0	–	–	–	1	0	
23	Fred Grace	1880	1880	1	0	0	0.00	0	–	–	–	2	0	
24	W. G. Grace ‡	1880	1899	22	1,098	170	32.29	666	9	2/12	26.22	39	0	
25	Alfred Lyttelton †	1880	1884	4	94	31	15.66	48	4	4/19	4.75	2	0	
26	Fred Morley	1880	1883	4	6	2*	1.50	972	16	5/56	18.50	4	0	
27	Frank Penn	1880	1880	1	50	27*	50.00	12	0	–	–	0	0	
28	A. G. Steel ‡	1880	1888	13	600	148	35.29	1,360	29	3/67	20.86	5	0	
29	Dick Barlow	1881	1887	17	591	62	22.73	2,456	34	7/40	22.55	14	0	
30	Billy Bates	1881	1887	15	656	64	27.33	2,364	50	7/28	16.42	9	0	
31	Billy Midwinter	1881	1882	4	95	36	13.57	776	10	4/81	27.20	5	0	(Note: John Ferris, Billy Midwinter, Billy Murdoch, Albert Trott and Sammy Woods have also played Test cricket for Australia. Only their records for England are given above.)
32	Ted Peate	1881	1886	9	70	13	11.66	2,096	31	6/85	22.03	2	0	
33	Dick Pilling †	1881	1888	8	91	23	7.58	0	–	–	–	10	4	
34	William Scotton	1881	1887	15	510	90	22.17	20	0	–	–	4	0	
35	Arthur Shrewsbury ‡	1881	1893	23	1,277	164	35.47	12	0	–	–	29	0	
36	Maurice Read	1882	1893	17	461	57	17.07	0	–	–	–	8	0	
37	Charles Studd	1882	1883	5	160	48	20.00	384	3	2/35	32.66	5	0	
38	Ivo Bligh ‡	1882	1883	4	62	19	10.33	0	–	–	–	7	0	
39	Charles Leslie	1882	1883	4	106	54	15.14	96	4	3/31	11.00	1	0	
40	Walter Read ‡	1882	1893	18	720	117	27.69	60	0	–	–	16	0	
41	George Studd	1882	1883	4	31	9	4.42	0	–	–	–	8	0	
42	Edward Tylecote †	1882	1886	6	152	66	19.00	0	–	–	–	5	5	
43	George Vernon	1882	1883	1	14	11*	14.00	0	–	–	–	0	0	
44	Tim O'Brien ‡	1884	1896	5	59	20	7.37	0	–	–	–	4	0	
45	Stanley Christopherson	1884	1884	1	17	17	17.00	136	1	1/52	69.00	0	0	
46	William Attewell	1884	1892	10	150	43*	16.66	2,850	28	4/42	22.35	9	0	
47	Johnny Briggs	1884	1899	33	815	121	18.11	5,332	118	8/11	17.75	12	0	
48	Wilfred Flowers	1884	1893	8	254	56	18.14	858	14	5/46	21.14	2	0	
49	Joe Hunter †	1884	1885	5	93	39*	18.60	0	–	–	–	8	3	
50	Bobby Peel	1884	1896	20	427	83	14.72	5,216	101	7/31	16.98	17	0	
51	George Lohmann	1886	1896	18	213	62*	8.87	3,830	112	9/28	10.75	28	0	
52	William Gunn	1887	1899	11	392	102*	21.77	0	–	–	–	5	0	
53	Mordecai Sherwin †	1887	1888	3	30	21*	15.00	0	–	–	–	5	2	
54	Reginald Wood	1887	1887	1	6	6	3.00	0	–	–	–	0	0	
55	Billy Newham	1888	1888	1	26	17	13.00	0	–	–	–	0	0	
56	Andrew Stoddart ‡	1888	1898	16	996	173	35.57	162	2	1/10	47.00	6	0	
57	Bobby Abel	1888	1902	13	744	132*	37.20	0	–	–	–	13	0	
58	John Shuter	1888	1888	1	28	28	28.00	0	–	–	–	0	0	
59	Frank Sugg	1888	1888	2	55	31	27.50	0	–	–	–	0	0	
60	Henry Wood †	1888	1892	4	204	134*	68.00	0	–	–	–	2	1	
61	Monty Bowden ‡	1889	1889	2	25	25	12.50	0	–	–	–	1	0	
62	Charles Coventry	1889	1889	2	13	12	13.00	0	–	–	–	0	0	
63	Arnold Fothergill	1889	1889	2	33	32	16.50	321	8	4/19	11.25	0	0	
64	Basil Grieve	1889	1889	2	40	14*	40.00	0	–	–	–	0	0	
65	Frank Hearne	1889	1889	2	47	27	23.50	0	–	–	–	1	0	(Note: Frank Hearne and Frank Mitchell have also played Test cricket for South Africa. Only their records for England are given above.)
66	C. Aubrey Smith	1889	1889	1	3	3	3.00	154	7	5/19	8.71	0	0	
67	Joseph McMaster	1889	1889	1	0	0	0.00	0	–	–	–	0	0	

== Golden Age: 1890–1914 ==
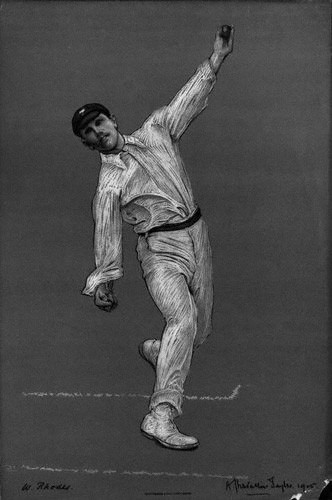
Wilfred Rhodes (121) in action.

The period between 1890 and immediately before the First World War is known as the Golden Age of cricket. It saw great amateur players such as CB Fry (95), the Indian Prince Ranjitsinhji (105) and captains Stanley Jackson (82), Archie MacLaren (92) and Plum Warner (118) as the leading lights in an era eulogised by Neville Cardus and others. In reality, it was not quite the great age of the amateur related in Cardus's writings. Sydney Barnes (129) became the best paid cricketer by spurning county cricket to play in the Lancashire leagues.

The era featured several prominent cricketers, including Jack Hobbs (157), Tom Hayward (97), Gilbert Jessop (122) and Wilfred Rhodes (121). During this period, Bernard Bosanquet (137) developed the googly, while Tip Foster (138) became the only person to captain England in both cricket and football. Rhodes also established the record for the longest Test cricket career, spanning 30 years, 10 months and 11 days.

England Test cricketers who made their debut between 1890 and 1914
Cap	Name	First	Last	Mat	Runs	HS	Avg	Balls	Wkt	BBI	Ave	Ca	St	Ref(s)
Cap	Name	First	Last	Mat	Batting			Bowling				Fielding		Ref(s)
68	Gregor MacGregor †	1890	1893	8	96	31	12.00	0	–	–	–	14	3	
69	James Cranston	1890	1890	1	31	16	15.50	0	–	–	–	1	0	
70	Frederick Martin	1890	1892	2	14	13	7.00	410	14	6/50	10.07	2	0	
71	John Sharpe	1890	1892	3	44	26	22.00	975	11	6/84	27.72	2	0	
72	George Bean	1892	1892	3	92	50	18.40	0	–	–	–	4	0	
73	Victor Barton	1892	1892	1	23	23	23.00	0	–	–	–	0	0	
74	William Chatterton	1892	1892	1	48	48	48.00	0	–	–	–	0	0	
75	J. J. Ferris	1892	1892	1	16	16	16.00	272	13	7/37	7.00	0	0	
76	Alec Hearne	1892	1892	1	9	9	9.00	0	–	–	–	1	0	
77	George Hearne	1892	1892	1	0	0	0.00	0	–	–	–	0	0	
78	Jack T. Hearne	1892	1899	12	126	40	9.00	2,976	49	6/41	22.08	4	0	
79	Billy Murdoch †	1892	1892	1	12	12	12.00	0	–	–	–	0	1	
80	Dick Pougher	1892	1892	1	17	17	17.00	105	3	3/26	8.66	2	0	
81	Hylton Philipson †	1892	1895	5	63	30	9.00	0	–	–	–	8	3	
82	Stanley Jackson ‡	1893	1905	20	1,415	144*	48.79	1,587	24	5/52	33.29	10	0	
83	Bill Lockwood	1893	1902	12	231	52*	17.76	1,973	43	7/71	20.53	4	0	
84	Arthur Mold	1893	1893	3	0	0*	0.00	491	7	3/44	33.42	1	0	
85	Ted Wainwright	1893	1898	5	132	49	14.66	127	0	–	–	2	0	
86	Albert Ward	1893	1895	7	487	117	37.46	0	–	–	–	1	0	
87	Bill Brockwell	1893	1899	7	202	49	16.83	582	5	3/33	61.80	6	0	
88	Tom Richardson	1893	1898	14	177	25*	11.06	4,498	88	8/94	25.22	5	0	
89	Jack Brown	1894	1899	8	470	140	36.15	35	0	–	–	7	0	
90	Francis Ford	1894	1895	5	168	48	18.66	204	1	1/47	129.00	5	0	
91	Leslie Gay †	1894	1894	1	37	33	18.50	0	–	–	–	3	1	
92	Archie MacLaren ‡	1894	1909	35	1,931	140	33.87	0	–	–	–	29	0	
93	Hugh Bromley-Davenport	1896	1899	4	128	84	21.33	155	4	2/46	24.50	1	0	
94	Harry Butt †	1896	1896	3	22	13	7.33	0	–	–	–	1	1	
95	C. B. Fry ‡	1896	1912	26	1,223	144	32.18	10	0	–	–	17	0	
96	Martin Hawke ‡	1896	1899	5	55	30	7.85	0	–	–	–	3	0	
97	Tom Hayward	1896	1909	35	1,999	137	34.46	893	14	4/22	36.71	19	0	
98	Ledger Hill	1896	1896	3	251	124	62.75	40	4	4/8	2.00	1	0	
99	Audley Miller	1896	1896	1	24	20*	–	0	–	–	–	0	0	
100	Sammy Woods	1896	1896	3	122	53	30.50	195	5	3/28	25.80	4	0	
101	Charles Wright	1896	1896	3	125	71	31.25	0	–	–	–	0	0	
102	Christopher Heseltine	1896	1896	2	18	18	9.00	157	5	5/38	16.80	3	0	
103	Ted Tyler	1896	1896	1	0	0	0.00	145	4	3/49	16.25	0	0	
104	Dick Lilley †	1896	1909	35	903	84	20.52	25	1	1/23	23.00	70	22	
105	Ranjitsinhji	1896	1902	15	999	175	44.95	97	1	1/23	39.00	13	0	
106	Teddy Wynyard	1896	1906	3	72	30	12.00	24	0	–	–	0	0	
107	Frank Druce	1897	1898	5	252	64	28.00	0	–	–	–	5	0	
108	George Hirst	1897	1909	24	790	85	22.57	4,010	59	5/48	30.00	18	0	
109	Jack Mason	1897	1898	5	129	32	12.90	324	2	1/8	74.50	3	0	
110	Bill Storer †	1897	1899	6	215	51	19.54	168	2	1/24	54.00	11	0	
111	Jack Board †	1899	1906	6	108	29	10.80	0	–	–	–	8	3	
112	Willis Cuttell	1899	1899	2	65	21	16.25	285	6	3/17	12.16	2	0	
113	Schofield Haigh	1899	1912	11	113	25	7.53	1,294	24	6/11	25.91	8	0	
114	Frank Milligan	1899	1899	2	58	38	14.50	45	0	–	–	1	0	
115	Frank Mitchell	1899	1899	2	88	41	22.00	0	–	–	–	2	0	
116	Albert Trott	1899	1899	2	23	16	5.75	474	17	5/49	11.64	0	0	
117	Johnny Tyldesley	1899	1909	31	1,661	138	30.75	0	–	–	–	16	0	
118	Pelham Warner ‡	1899	1912	15	622	132*	23.92	0	–	–	–	3	0	
119	Clem Wilson	1899	1899	2	42	18	14.00	0	–	–	–	0	0	
120	Alfred Archer	1899	1899	1	31	24*	31.00	0	–	–	–	0	0	
121	Wilfred Rhodes	1899	1930	58	2,325	179	30.19	8,225	127	8/68	26.96	60	0	
122	Gilbert Jessop	1899	1912	18	569	104	21.88	732	10	4/68	35.40	11	0	
123	Walter Mead	1899	1899	1	7	7	3.50	265	1	1/91	91.00	1	0	
124	Charlie Townsend	1899	1899	2	51	38	17.00	140	3	3/50	25.00	0	0	
125	Willie Quaife	1899	1902	7	228	68	19.00	15	0	–	–	4	0	
126	Sailor Young	1899	1899	2	43	43	21.50	556	12	4/30	21.83	1	0	
127	Bill Bradley	1899	1899	2	23	23*	23.00	625	5	5/67	38.83	0	0	
128	Arthur Jones ‡	1899	1909	12	291	34	13.85	228	3	3/73	44.33	15	0	
129	Sydney Barnes	1901	1914	27	242	38*	8.06	7,873	189	9/103	16.43	12	0	
130	Colin Blythe	1901	1910	19	183	27	9.63	4,546	100	8/59	18.63	6	0	
131	Len Braund	1901	1908	23	987	104	25.97	3,805	47	8/81	38.51	39	0	
132	John Gunn	1901	1905	6	85	24	10.62	999	18	5/76	21.50	3	0	
133	Charlie McGahey	1902	1902	2	38	18	9.50	0	–	–	–	1	0	
134	Lionel Palairet	1902	1902	2	49	20	12.25	0	–	–	–	2	0	
135	Fred Tate	1902	1902	1	9	5*	9.00	96	2	2/7	25.50	2	0	
136	Ted Arnold	1903	1907	10	160	40	13.33	1,677	31	5/37	25.41	8	0	
137	Bernard Bosanquet	1903	1905	7	147	27	13.36	970	25	8/107	24.16	9	0	
138	R. E. Foster ‡	1903	1907	8	602	287	46.30	0	–	–	–	13	0	
139	Albert Relf	1903	1914	13	416	63	23.11	1,764	25	5/85	24.96	14	0	
140	Arthur Fielder	1904	1908	6	78	20	11.14	1,491	26	6/82	27.34	4	0	
141	Albert Knight	1904	1904	3	81	70*	16.20	0	–	–	–	1	0	
142	David Denton	1905	1910	11	424	104	20.19	0	–	–	–	8	0	
143	Arnold Warren	1905	1905	1	7	7	7.00	236	6	5/57	18.83	1	0	
144	Walter Brearley	1905	1912	4	21	11*	7.00	705	17	5/110	21.11	0	0	
145	Reggie Spooner	1905	1912	10	481	119	32.06	0	–	–	–	4	0	
146	Jack Crawford	1906	1908	12	469	74	22.33	2,203	39	5/48	29.48	13	0	
147	Frederick Fane ‡	1906	1910	14	682	143	26.23	0	–	–	–	6	0	
148	Ernie Hayes	1906	1912	5	86	35	10.75	90	1	1/28	52.00	2	0	
149	Walter Lees	1906	1906	5	66	25*	11.00	1,256	26	6/78	17.96	2	0	
150	Leonard Moon †	1906	1906	4	182	36	22.75	0	–	–	–	4	0	
151	John Hartley	1906	1906	2	15	9	3.75	192	1	1/62	115.00	2	0	
152	Neville Knox	1907	1907	2	24	8*	8.00	126	3	2/39	35.00	0	0	
153	George Gunn	1907	1930	15	1,120	122*	40.00	12	0	–	–	15	0	
154	Joe Hardstaff Sr	1907	1908	5	311	72	31.10	0	–	–	–	1	0	
155	Kenneth Hutchings	1907	1909	7	341	126	28.41	90	1	1/5	81.00	9	0	
156	Dick Young †	1907	1908	2	27	13	6.75	0	–	–	–	6	0	
157	Jack Hobbs	1908	1930	61	5,410	211	56.94	376	1	1/19	165.00	17	0	
158	Joe Humphries †	1908	1908	3	44	16	8.80	0	–	–	–	7	0	
159	George Thompson	1909	1910	6	273	63	30.33	1,367	23	4/50	27.73	5	0	
160	John King	1909	1909	1	64	60	32.00	162	1	1/99	99.00	0	0	
161	Jack Sharp	1909	1909	3	188	105	47.00	183	3	3/67	37.00	1	0	
162	Douglas Carr	1909	1909	1	0	0	0.00	414	7	5/146	40.28	0	0	
163	Frank Woolley	1909	1934	64	3,283	154	36.07	6,495	83	7/76	33.91	64	0	
164	Morice Bird	1910	1914	10	280	61	15.00	259	8	3/11	15.00	5	0	
165	Claude Buckenham	1910	1910	5	43	17	6.14	1,182	21	5/115	28.23	2	0	
166	H. D. G. Leveson Gower ‡	1910	1910	3	95	31	23.75	0	–	–	–	1	0	
167	George Simpson-Hayward	1910	1910	5	105	29*	15.00	898	23	6/43	18.26	1	0	
168	Herbert Strudwick †	1910	1926	28	230	24	7.93	0	–	–	–	61	12	
169	Neville Tufnell †	1910	1910	1	14	14	14.00	0	–	–	–	0	1	
170	Johnny Douglas ‡	1911	1925	23	962	119	29.15	2,812	45	5/46	33.02	9	0	
171	Frank Foster	1911	1912	11	330	71	23.57	2,447	45	6/91	20.57	11	0	
172	Jack W. Hearne	1911	1926	24	806	114	26.00	2,926	30	5/49	48.73	13	0	
173	Septimus Kinneir	1911	1911	1	52	30	26.00	0	–	–	–	0	0	
174	Phil Mead	1911	1928	17	1,185	182*	49.37	0	–	–	–	4	0	
175	Bill Hitch	1912	1921	7	103	51*	14.71	462	7	2/31	46.42	4	0	
176	Tiger Smith †	1912	1913	11	113	22	8.69	0	–	–	–	17	3	
177	Joe Vine	1912	1912	2	46	36	46.00	0	–	–	–	0	0	
178	Harry Dean	1912	1912	3	10	8	5.00	447	11	4/19	13.90	2	0	
179	Major Booth	1913	1914	2	46	32	23.00	312	7	4/49	18.57	0	0	
180	Lionel Tennyson ‡	1913	1921	9	345	74*	31.36	6	0	–	–	6	0	

== Inter-war years: 1919–1939 ==
England Test cricketers who made their debut between 1919 and 1939
Cap	Name	First	Last	Mat	Runs	HS	Avg	Balls	Wkt	BBI	Ave	Ca	St	Ref(s)
Cap	Name	First	Last	Mat	Batting			Bowling				Fielding		Ref(s)
181	Patsy Hendren	1920	1935	51	3,525	205*	47.63	47	1	1/32	31.00	33	0	
182	Cec Parkin	1920	1924	10	160	36	12.30	2,095	32	5/38	35.25	3	0	
183	Jack Russell	1920	1923	10	910	140	56.87	0	–	–	–	8	0	
184	Abe Waddington	1920	1921	2	16	7	4.00	276	1	1/35	119.00	1	0	
185	Harry Howell	1920	1924	5	15	5	7.50	918	7	4/115	79.85	0	0	
186	Harry Makepeace	1920	1921	4	279	117	34.87	0	–	–	–	0	0	
187	Percy Fender	1921	1929	13	380	60	19.00	2,178	29	5/90	40.86	14	0	
188	Arthur Dolphin †	1921	1921	1	1	1	0.50	0	–	–	–	1	0	
189	Rockley Wilson	1921	1921	1	10	5	5.00	123	3	2/28	12.00	0	0	
190	Percy Holmes	1921	1932	7	357	88	27.46	0	–	–	–	3	0	
191	Vallance Jupp	1921	1928	8	208	38	17.33	1,301	28	4/37	22.00	5	0	
192	Donald Knight	1921	1921	2	54	38	13.50	0	–	–	–	1	0	
193	Tom Richmond	1921	1921	1	6	4	3.00	114	2	2/69	43.00	0	0	
194	Ernest Tyldesley	1921	1929	14	990	122	55.00	3	0	–	–	2	0	
195	Alf Dipper	1921	1921	1	51	40	25.50	0	–	–	–	0	0	
196	Jack Durston	1921	1921	1	8	6*	8.00	202	5	4/102	27.20	0	0	
197	John Evans	1921	1921	1	18	14	9.00	0	–	–	–	0	0	
198	Nigel Haig	1921	1930	5	126	47	14.00	1,026	13	3/73	34.46	4	0	
199	George Brown †	1921	1923	7	299	84	29.90	0	–	–	–	9	3	
200	Andy Ducat	1921	1921	1	5	3	2.50	0	–	–	–	1	0	
201	Wally Hardinge	1921	1921	1	30	25	15.00	0	–	–	–	0	0	
202	Jack White ‡	1921	1931	15	239	29	18.38	4,801	49	8/126	32.26	6	0	
203	Charlie Hallows	1921	1928	2	42	26	42.00	0	–	–	–	0	0	
204	Charlie Parker	1921	1921	1	3	3*	–	168	2	2/32	16.00	0	0	
205	Andy Sandham	1921	1930	14	879	325	38.21	0	–	–	–	4	0	
206	Arthur Carr ‡	1922	1929	11	237	63	19.75	0	–	–	–	3	0	
207	Arthur Gilligan ‡	1922	1925	11	209	39*	16.07	2,404	36	6/7	29.05	3	0	
208	Alec Kennedy	1922	1923	5	93	41*	15.50	1,683	31	5/76	19.32	5	0	
209	Frank Mann	1922	1923	5	281	84	35.12	0	–	–	–	4	0	
210	Greville Stevens ‡	1922	1930	10	263	69	15.47	1,186	20	5/90	32.40	9	0	
211	George Macaulay	1923	1933	8	112	76	18.66	1,701	24	5/64	27.58	5	0	
212	George Street †	1923	1923	1	11	7*	11.00	0	–	–	–	0	1	
213	Percy Chapman ‡	1924	1931	26	925	121	28.90	40	0	–	–	32	0	
214	Roy Kilner	1924	1926	9	233	74	33.28	2,368	24	4/51	30.58	6	0	
215	Herbert Sutcliffe	1924	1935	54	4,555	194	60.73	0	–	–	–	23	0	
216	Maurice Tate	1924	1935	39	1,198	100*	25.48	12,523	155	6/42	26.16	11	0	
217	George Wood †	1924	1924	3	7	6	3.50	0	–	–	–	5	1	
218	Dick Tyldesley	1924	1930	7	47	29	7.83	1,615	19	3/50	32.57	1	0	
219	George Duckworth †	1924	1936	24	234	39*	14.62	0	–	–	–	45	15	
220	George Geary	1924	1934	14	249	66	15.56	3,810	46	7/70	29.41	13	0	
221	Jack MacBryan	1924	1924	1	–	–	–	0	–	–	–	0	0	
222	Tich Freeman	1924	1929	12	154	50*	14.00	3,732	66	7/71	25.86	4	0	
223	William Whysall	1925	1930	4	209	76	29.85	16	0	–	–	7	0	
224	Fred Root	1926	1926	3	–	–	–	642	8	4/84	24.25	1	0	
225	Harold Larwood	1926	1933	21	485	98	19.40	4,969	78	6/32	28.35	15	0	
226	Ewart Astill	1927	1930	9	190	40	12.66	2,182	25	4/58	34.24	7	0	
227	Wally Hammond ‡	1927	1947	85	7,249	336*	58.45	7,969	83	5/36	37.80	110	0	
228	Geoffrey Legge	1927	1930	5	299	196	49.83	30	0	–	–	1	0	
229	Ian Peebles	1927	1931	13	98	26	10.88	2,882	45	6/63	30.91	5	0	
230	Rony Stanyforth †	1927	1928	4	13	6*	2.60	0	–	–	–	7	2	
231	Bob Wyatt ‡	1927	1937	40	1,839	149	31.70	1,395	18	3/4	35.66	16	0	
232	Sam Staples	1928	1928	3	65	39	13.00	1,149	15	3/50	29.00	0	0	
233	Eddie Dawson	1928	1930	5	175	55	19.44	0	–	–	–	0	0	
234	Harry Elliott †	1928	1934	4	61	37*	15.25	0	–	–	–	8	3	
235	Douglas Jardine ‡	1928	1934	22	1,296	127	48.00	6	0	–	–	26	0	
236	Harry Smith †	1928	1928	1	7	7	7.00	0	–	–	–	1	0	
237	Maurice Leyland	1928	1938	41	2,764	187	46.06	1,103	6	3/91	97.50	13	0	
238	K. S. Duleepsinhji	1929	1931	12	995	173	58.52	6	0	–	–	10	0	
239	Tom Killick	1929	1929	2	81	31	20.25	0	–	–	–	2	0	
240	Jack O'Connor	1929	1930	4	153	51	21.85	162	1	1/31	72.00	2	0	
241	Walter Robins ‡	1929	1937	19	612	108	26.60	3,318	64	6/32	27.46	12	0	
242	Ted Bowley	1929	1930	5	252	109	36.00	252	0	–	–	2	0	
243	Fred Barratt	1929	1930	5	28	17	9.33	750	5	1/8	47.00	2	0	
244	Les Ames †	1929	1939	47	2,434	149	40.56	0	–	–	–	74	23	
245	Nobby Clark	1929	1934	8	36	10	9.00	1,931	32	5/98	28.09	0	0	
246	Maurice Allom	1930	1931	5	14	8*	14.00	817	14	5/38	18.92	0	0	
247	Tich Cornford †	1930	1930	4	36	18	9.00	0	–	–	–	5	3	
248	Harold Gilligan	1930	1930	4	71	32	17.75	0	–	–	–	0	0	
249	Stan Nichols	1930	1939	14	355	78*	29.58	2,565	41	6/35	28.09	11	0	
250	Maurice Turnbull	1930	1936	9	224	61	20.36	0	–	–	–	1	0	
251	Stan Worthington	1930	1937	9	321	128	29.18	633	8	2/19	39.50	8	0	
252	Freddie Calthorpe ‡	1930	1930	4	129	49	18.42	204	1	1/38	91.00	3	0	
253	Bill Voce	1930	1947	27	308	66	13.39	6,360	98	7/70	27.88	15	0	
254	Leslie Townsend	1930	1934	4	97	40	16.16	399	6	2/22	34.16	2	0	
255	Gubby Allen ‡	1930	1948	25	750	122	24.19	4,386	81	7/80	29.37	20	0	
256	Tom Goddard	1930	1939	8	13	8	6.50	1,563	22	6/29	26.72	3	0	
257	Bill Farrimond †	1931	1935	4	116	35	16.57	0	–	–	–	5	2	
258	Harry Lee	1931	1931	1	19	18	9.50	0	–	–	–	0	0	
259	Johnny Arnold	1931	1931	1	34	34	17.00	0	–	–	–	0	0	
260	Fred Bakewell	1931	1935	6	409	107	45.44	18	0	–	–	3	0	
261	Freddie Brown ‡	1931	1953	22	734	79	25.31	3,260	45	5/49	31.06	22	0	
262	Hedley Verity	1931	1939	40	669	66*	20.90	11,173	144	8/43	24.37	30	0	
263	Eddie Paynter	1931	1939	20	1,540	243	59.23	0	–	–	–	7	0	
264	Bill Bowes	1932	1946	15	28	10*	4.66	3,655	68	6/33	22.33	2	0	
265	Iftikhar Ali Khan Pataudi	1932	1934	3	144	102	28.80	0	–	–	–	0	0	(Note: The Nawab of Pataudi also played Test cricket for India. Only his record for England is given above.)
266	Tommy Mitchell	1933	1935	5	20	9	5.00	894	8	2/49	62.25	1	0	
267	Cyril Walters	1933	1934	11	784	102	52.26	0	–	–	–	6	0	
268	James Langridge	1933	1946	8	242	70	26.88	1,074	19	7/56	21.73	6	0	
269	Charlie Barnett	1933	1948	20	1,098	129	35.41	256	0	–	–	14	0	
270	Charles Marriott	1933	1933	1	0	0	0.00	247	11	6/59	8.72	1	0	
271	Arthur Mitchell	1933	1936	6	298	72	29.80	6	0	–	–	9	0	
272	Bryan Valentine	1933	1939	7	454	136	64.85	0	–	–	–	2	0	
273	Hopper Levett †	1934	1934	1	7	5	7.00	0	–	–	–	3	0	
274	Ken Farnes	1934	1939	15	58	20	4.83	3,932	60	6/96	28.65	1	0	
275	Len Hopwood	1934	1934	2	12	8	6.00	462	0	–	–	0	0	
276	Walter Keeton	1934	1939	2	57	25	14.25	0	–	–	–	0	0	
277	Eric Hollies	1935	1950	13	37	18*	5.28	3,554	44	7/50	30.27	2	0	
278	Errol Holmes	1935	1935	5	114	85*	16.28	108	2	1/10	38.00	4	0	
279	Jack Iddon	1935	1935	5	170	73	28.33	66	0	–	–	0	0	
280	George Paine	1935	1935	4	97	49	16.16	1,044	17	5/168	27.47	5	0	
281	Jim Smith	1935	1937	5	102	27	10.20	930	15	5/16	26.20	1	0	
282	David Townsend	1935	1935	3	77	36	12.83	6	0	–	–	1	0	
283	Mandy Mitchell-Innes	1935	1935	1	5	5	5.00	0	–	–	–	0	0	
284	Wilf Barber	1935	1935	2	83	44	20.75	2	1	1/0	0.00	1	0	
285	Joe Hardstaff Jr	1935	1948	23	1,636	205*	46.74	0	–	–	–	9	0	
286	Jim Sims	1935	1937	4	16	12	4.00	887	11	5/73	43.63	6	0	
287	Denis Smith	1935	1935	2	128	57	32.00	0	–	–	–	1	0	
288	Johnnie Clay	1935	1935	1	–	–	–	192	0	–	–	1	0	
289	Hopper Read	1935	1935	1	–	–	–	270	6	4/136	33.33	0	0	
290	Harold Gimblett	1936	1939	3	129	67*	32.25	0	–	–	–	1	0	
291	Arthur Fagg	1936	1939	5	150	39	18.75	0	–	–	–	5	0	
292	Laurie Fishlock	1936	1947	4	47	19*	11.75	0	–	–	–	1	0	
293	Alf Gover	1936	1946	4	2	2*	–	816	8	3/85	44.87	1	0	
294	Len Hutton ‡	1937	1955	79	6,971	364	56.67	260	3	1/2	77.33	57	0	
295	Jim Parks senior	1937	1937	1	29	22	14.50	126	3	2/26	12.00	0	0	
296	Arthur Wellard	1937	1938	2	47	38	11.75	456	7	4/81	33.85	2	0	
297	Denis Compton	1937	1957	78	5,807	278	50.06	2,710	25	5/70	56.40	49	0	
298	Austin Matthews	1937	1937	1	2	2*	–	180	2	1/13	32.50	1	0	
299	Cyril Washbrook	1937	1956	37	2,569	195	42.81	36	1	1/25	33.00	12	0	
300	Bill Edrich	1938	1955	39	2,440	219	40.00	3,234	41	4/68	41.29	39	0	
301	Reg Sinfield	1938	1938	1	6	6	6.00	378	2	1/51	61.50	0	0	
302	Doug Wright	1938	1951	34	289	45	11.11	8,135	108	7/105	39.11	10	0	
303	Fred Price †	1938	1938	1	6	6	3.00	0	–	–	–	2	0	
304	Arthur Wood †	1938	1939	4	80	53	20.00	0	–	–	–	10	1	
305	Paul Gibb †	1938	1946	8	581	120	44.69	0	–	–	–	3	1	
306	Len Wilkinson	1938	1939	3	3	20	3.00	573	7	2/12	38.71	0	0	
307	Norman Yardley ‡	1938	1950	20	812	99	25.37	1,662	21	3/67	33.66	14	0	
308	Reg Perks	1939	1939	2	3	2*	–	829	11	5/100	32.27	1	0	
309	Bill Copson	1939	1947	3	6	6	6.00	762	15	5/85	19.80	1	0	
310	Buddy Oldfield	1939	1939	1	99	80	49.50	0	–	–	–	0	0	

== Post-war years: 1946–1959 ==
England Test cricketers who made their debut between 1946 and 1959
Cap	Name	First	Last	Mat	Runs	HS	Avg	Balls	Wkt	BBI	Ave	Ca	St	Ref(s)
Cap	Name	First	Last	Mat	Batting			Bowling				Fielding		Ref(s)
311	Alec Bedser	1946	1955	51	714	79	12.75	15,918	236	7/44	24.89	26	0	
312	Jack Ikin	1946	1955	18	606	60	20.89	572	3	1/38	118.00	31	0	
313	Frank Smailes	1946	1946	1	25	25	25.00	120	3	3/44	20.66	0	0	
314	Dick Pollard	1946	1948	4	13	10*	13.00	1,102	15	5/24	25.20	3	0	
315	Godfrey Evans †	1946	1959	91	2,439	104	20.49	0	–	–	–	173	46	
316	Peter Smith	1946	1947	4	33	24	6.60	538	3	2/172	106.33	1	0	
317	Sam Cook	1947	1947	1	4	4	2.00	180	0	–	–	0	0	
318	Tom Dollery	1947	1950	4	72	37	10.28	0	–	–	–	1	0	
319	Jack Martin	1947	1947	1	26	26	13.00	270	1	1/111	129.00	0	0	
320	George Pope	1947	1947	1	8	8*	–	218	1	1/49	85.00	0	0	
321	Ken Cranston ‡	1947	1948	8	209	45	14.92	1,010	18	4/12	25.61	3	0	
322	Cliff Gladwin	1947	1949	8	170	51*	28.33	2,129	15	3/21	38.06	2	0	
323	Harold Butler	1947	1948	2	15	15*	5.60	552	12	4/34	17.91	1	0	
324	Jack Young	1947	1949	8	28	10*	5.60	2,368	17	3/65	44.52	5	0	
325	Dick Howorth	1947	1948	5	145	45*	18.12	1,536	19	6/124	33.42	2	0	
326	Jack Robertson	1947	1952	11	881	133	46.36	138	2	2/17	29.00	6	0	
327	Dennis Brookes	1948	1948	1	17	10	8.50	0	–	–	–	1	0	
328	Jim Laker	1948	1959	46	676	63	14.08	12,027	193	10/53	21.24	12	0	
329	Winston Place	1948	1948	3	144	107	28.80	0	–	–	–	0	0	
330	Gerald Smithson	1948	1948	2	70	35	23.33	0	–	–	–	0	0	
331	Maurice Tremlett	1948	1948	3	20	18*	6.66	492	4	2/98	56.50	0	0	
332	Billy Griffith	1948	1949	3	157	140	31.40	0	–	–	–	5	0	
333	Johnny Wardle	1948	1957	28	653	66	19.78	6,597	102	7/36	20.39	12	0	
334	Alec Coxon	1948	1948	1	19	19	9.50	378	3	2/90	57.33	0	0	
335	Jack Crapp	1948	1949	7	319	56	29.00	0	–	–	–	7	0	
336	George Emmett	1948	1948	1	10	10	5.00	0	–	–	–	0	0	
337	John Dewes	1948	1950	5	121	67	12.10	0	–	–	–	0	0	
338	Allan Watkins	1948	1952	15	810	137*	40.50	1,364	11	3/20	50.36	17	0	
339	Roly Jenkins	1948	1952	9	198	39	18.00	2,118	32	5/116	34.31	4	0	
340	George Mann ‡	1948	1949	7	376	136*	37.60	0	–	–	–	3	0	
341	Reg Simpson	1948	1955	27	1,401	156*	33.35	45	2	2/4	11.00	5	0	
342	Trevor Bailey	1949	1959	61	2,290	134*	29.74	9,712	132	7/34	29.21	32	0	
343	Alan Wharton	1949	1949	1	20	13	10.00	0	–	–	–	0	0	
344	Brian Close ‡	1949	1976	22	887	70	25.34	1,212	18	4/35	29.55	24	0	
345	Les Jackson	1949	1961	2	15	8	15.00	498	7	2/26	22.14	1	0	
346	Bob Berry	1950	1950	2	6	4*	3.00	653	9	5/63	25.33	2	0	
347	Hubert Doggart	1950	1950	2	76	29	19.00	0	–	–	–	3	0	
348	Gilbert Parkhouse	1950	1959	7	373	78	28.69	0	–	–	–	3	0	
349	Doug Insole	1950	1957	9	408	110*	27.20	0	–	–	–	8	0	
350	Derek Shackleton	1950	1963	7	113	42	18.83	2,078	18	4/72	42.66	1	0	
351	Malcolm Hilton	1950	1952	4	37	15	7.40	1,244	14	5/61	34.07	1	0	
352	Arthur McIntyre †	1950	1955	3	19	7	3.16	0	–	–	–	8	0	
353	David Sheppard ‡	1950	1963	22	1,172	119	37.80	0	–	–	–	12	0	
354	John Warr	1951	1951	2	4	4	1.00	584	1	1/76	281.00	0	0	
355	Roy Tattersall	1951	1954	16	50	10*	5.00	4,228	58	7/52	26.08	8	0	
356	Brian Statham	1951	1965	70	675	38	11.44	16,056	252	7/39	24.84	28	0	
357	Willie Watson	1951	1959	23	879	116	25.85	0	–	–	–	8	0	
358	Tom Graveney ‡	1951	1969	79	4,882	258	44.38	260	1	1/34	167.00	80	0	
359	Don Brennan †	1951	1951	2	16	16	8.00	0	–	–	–	0	1	
360	Frank Lowson	1951	1955	7	245	68	18.84	0	–	–	–	5	0	
361	Peter May ‡	1951	1961	66	4,537	285*	46.77	0	–	–	–	42	0	
362	Donald Carr ‡	1951	1952	2	135	76	33.75	210	2	2/84	70.00	0	0	
363	Nigel Howard	1951	1952	4	86	23	17.20	0	–	–	–	4	0	
364	Don Kenyon	1951	1955	8	192	87	12.80	0	–	–	–	5	0	
365	Fred Ridgway	1951	1952	5	49	24	8.16	793	7	4/83	54.14	3	0	
366	Dick Spooner †	1951	1955	7	354	92	27.23	0	–	–	–	10	2	
367	Eddie Leadbeater	1951	1952	2	40	38	20.00	289	2	1/38	109.00	3	0	
368	Cyril Poole	1952	1952	3	161	69*	40.25	30	0	–	–	1	0	
369	Fred Trueman	1952	1965	67	981	39*	13.81	15,178	307	8/31	21.57	64	0	
370	Tony Lock	1952	1968	49	742	89	13.74	13,147	174	7/35	25.58	59	0	
371	Alan Moss	1954	1960	9	61	26	10.16	1,657	21	4/35	29.80	1	0	
372	Charles Palmer	1954	1954	1	22	22	11.00	30	0	–	–	0	0	
373	Bob Appleyard	1954	1956	9	51	19*	17.00	1,596	31	5/51	17.87	4	0	
374	Jim McConnon	1954	1954	2	18	11	9.00	216	4	3/19	18.50	4	0	
375	Jim Parks junior †	1954	1968	46	1,962	108*	32.16	54	1	1/43	51.00	103	11	
376	Peter Loader	1954	1959	13	76	17	5.84	2,662	39	6/36	22.51	2	0	
377	Frank Tyson	1954	1959	17	230	37*	10.95	3,452	76	7/27	18.56	4	0	
378	Keith Andrew †	1954	1963	2	29	15	9.66	0	–	–	–	1	0	
379	Colin Cowdrey ‡	1954	1975	114	7,624	182	44.06	119	0	–	–	120	0	
380	Ken Barrington	1955	1968	82	6,806	256	58.67	2,715	29	3/4	44.82	58	0	
381	Fred Titmus	1955	1975	53	1,449	84*	22.29	15,118	153	7/79	32.22	35	0	
382	Peter Richardson	1956	1963	34	2,061	126	37.47	120	3	2/10	16.00	6	0	
383	Alan Oakman	1956	1956	2	14	10	7.00	48	0	–	–	7	0	
384	Donald Smith	1957	1957	3	25	16*	8.33	270	1	1/12	97.00	0	0	
385	Dick Richardson	1957	1957	1	33	33	33.00	0	–	–	–	1	0	
386	Mike Smith ‡	1958	1972	50	2,278	121	31.63	214	1	1/10	128.00	53	0	
387	Arthur Milton	1958	1959	6	204	104*	25.50	24	0	–	–	5	0	
388	Ted Dexter ‡	1958	1968	62	4,502	205	47.89	5,317	66	4/10	34.93	29	0	
389	Ray Illingworth ‡	1958	1973	61	1,836	113	23.24	11,934	122	6/29	31.20	45	0	
390	Raman Subba Row	1958	1961	13	984	137	46.85	6	0	–	–	5	0	
391	Roy Swetman †	1959	1960	11	254	65	16.93	0	–	–	–	24	2	
392	John Mortimore	1959	1964	9	243	73*	24.30	2,162	13	3/36	56.38	3	0	
393	Tommy Greenhough	1959	1960	4	4	2	1.33	1,129	16	5/35	22.31	1	0	
394	Martin Horton	1959	1959	2	60	58	30.00	238	2	2/24	29.50	2	0	
395	Ken Taylor	1959	1964	3	57	24	11.40	12	0	–	–	1	0	
396	Geoff Pullar	1959	1963	28	1,974	175	43.86	66	1	1/1	37.00	1	0	
397	Harold Rhodes	1959	1959	2	0	0*	–	449	9	4/50	27.11	0	0	

== 1960s ==
England Test cricketers who made their debut in the 1960s
Cap	Name	First	Last	Mat	Runs	HS	Avg	Balls	Wkt	BBI	Ave	Ca	St	Ref(s)
Cap	Name	First	Last	Mat	Batting			Bowling				Fielding		Ref(s)
398	David Allen	1960	1966	39	918	88	25.50	11,297	122	5/30	30.97	10	0	
399	Bob Barber	1960	1968	28	1,495	185	35.59	3,426	42	4/132	43.00	21	0	
400	Peter Walker	1960	1960	3	128	52	32.00	78	0	–	–	5	0	
401	Doug Padgett	1960	1960	2	51	31	12.75	12	0	–	–	0	0	
402	John Murray †	1961	1967	21	506	112	22.00	0	–	–	–	52	3	
403	Jack Flavell	1961	1964	4	31	14	7.75	792	7	2/65	52.42	0	0	
404	Alan Brown	1961	1961	2	3	3*	–	323	3	3/27	50.00	1	0	
405	Eric Russell	1961	1967	10	362	70	21.29	44	0	–	–	4	0	
406	Butch White	1961	1962	2	0	0	0.00	220	4	3/65	29.75	0	0	
407	David Smith	1961	1962	5	38	34	9.50	972	6	2/60	59.83	2	0	
408	Barry Knight	1961	1969	29	812	127	26.19	5,377	70	4/38	31.75	14	0	
409	Geoff Millman †	1962	1962	6	60	32*	12.00	0	–	–	–	13	2	
410	Peter Parfitt	1962	1972	37	1,882	131*	40.91	1,326	12	2/5	47.83	42	0	
411	Len Coldwell	1962	1964	7	9	6*	4.50	1,668	22	6/85	27.72	1	0	
412	Micky Stewart	1962	1964	8	385	87	35.00	0	–	–	–	6	0	
413	David Larter	1962	1965	10	16	10	3.20	2,172	37	5/57	25.43	5	0	
414	Alan Smith †	1962	1963	6	118	69*	29.50	0	–	–	–	20	0	
415	John Edrich ‡	1963	1976	77	5,138	310*	43.54	30	0	–	–	43	0	
416	Phil Sharpe	1963	1969	12	786	111	46.23	0	–	–	–	17	0	
417	Brian Bolus	1963	1964	7	496	88	41.33	18	0	–	–	2	0	
418	Don Wilson	1964	1971	6	75	42	12.50	1,472	11	2/17	42.36	1	0	
419	Jimmy Binks †	1964	1964	2	91	55	22.75	0	–	–	–	8	0	
420	Jeff Jones	1964	1968	15	38	16	4.75	3,546	44	6/118	40.20	4	0	
421	John Price	1964	1972	15	66	32	7.33	2,724	40	5/73	35.02	7	0	
422	Geoffrey Boycott ‡	1964	1982	108	8,114	246*	47.72	944	7	3/47	54.57	33	0	
423	Norman Gifford	1964	1973	15	179	25*	16.27	3,084	33	5/55	31.09	8	0	
424	Tom Cartwright	1964	1965	5	26	9	5.20	1,611	15	6/94	36.26	2	0	
425	Fred Rumsey	1964	1965	5	30	21*	15.00	1,145	17	4/25	27.11	0	0	
426	Ian Thomson	1964	1965	5	69	39	23.00	1,488	9	2/55	63.11	3	0	
427	Ken Palmer	1965	1965	1	10	10	10.00	378	1	1/113	189.00	0	0	
428	John Snow	1965	1976	49	772	73	13.54	12,021	202	7/40	26.66	16	0	
429	David Brown	1965	1969	26	342	44*	11.79	5,098	79	5/42	28.31	7	0	
430	Ken Higgs	1965	1968	15	185	63	11.56	4,112	71	6/91	20.74	4	0	
431	Colin Milburn	1966	1969	9	654	139	46.71	0	–	–	–	7	0	
432	Basil D'Oliveira	1966	1972	44	2,484	158	40.06	5,706	47	3/46	39.55	29	0	
433	Derek Underwood	1966	1982	86	937	45*	11.56	21,862	297	8/51	25.83	44	0	
434	Dennis Amiss	1966	1977	50	3,612	262*	46.30	0	–	–	–	24	0	
435	Robin Hobbs	1967	1971	7	34	15*	6.80	1,291	12	3/25	40.08	8	0	
436	Geoff Arnold	1967	1975	34	421	59	12.02	7,650	115	6/45	28.29	9	0	
437	Alan Knott †	1967	1981	95	4,389	135	32.75	0	–	–	–	250	19	
438	Pat Pocock	1968	1985	25	206	33	6.24	6,650	67	6/79	44.41	15	0	
439	Keith Fletcher ‡	1968	1982	59	3,272	216	39.90	285	2	1/6	96.50	54	0	
440	Roger Prideaux	1968	1969	3	102	64	20.40	12	0	–	–	0	0	
441	Bob Cottam	1969	1973	4	27	13	6.75	903	14	4/50	23.35	2	0	
442	John Hampshire	1969	1975	8	403	107	26.86	0	–	–	–	9	0	
443	Alan Ward	1969	1976	5	40	21	8.00	761	14	4/61	32.35	3	0	
444	Mike Denness ‡	1969	1975	28	1,667	188	39.69	0	–	–	–	28	0	

== 1970s ==
England Test cricketers who made their debut in the 1970s
Cap	Name	First	Last	Mat	Runs	HS	Avg	Balls	Wkt	BBI	Ave	Ca	St	Ref(s)
Cap	Name	First	Last	Mat	Batting			Bowling				Fielding		Ref(s)
696 (Note: Test cap 696 was awarded to Alan Jones by the England and Wales Cricket Board (ECB) on 17 June 2020. Jones represented England in one match against the Rest of the World in 1970, which was recognised as a Test match at the time, but later had its Test status revoked.)	Alan Jones	–	–	–	–	–	–	–	–	–	–	–	–	
445	Brian Luckhurst	1970	1974	21	1,298	131	36.05	57	1	1/9	32.00	14	0	
446	Ken Shuttleworth	1970	1971	5	46	21	7.66	1,071	12	5/47	35.58	1	0	
447	Peter Lever	1970	1975	17	350	88*	21.87	3,571	41	6/38	36.80	11	0	
448	Bob Willis ‡	1971	1984	90	840	28*	11.50	17,357	325	8/43	25.20	39	0	
449	Bob Taylor †	1971	1984	57	1,156	97	16.28	12	0	–	–	167	7	
450	Richard Hutton	1971	1971	5	219	81	36.50	738	9	3/72	28.55	9	0	
451	John Jameson	1971	1974	4	214	82	26.75	42	1	1/17	17.00	0	0	
452	Tony Greig ‡	1972	1977	58	3,599	148	40.43	9,802	141	8/86	32.20	87	0	
453	Barry Wood	1972	1978	12	454	90	21.61	98	0	–	–	6	0	
454	Tony Lewis ‡	1972	1973	9	457	125	32.64	0	–	–	–	0	0	
455	Chris Old	1973	1981	46	845	65	14.82	8,858	143	7/50	28.11	22	0	
456	Jack Birkenshaw	1973	1974	5	148	64	21.14	1,017	13	5/57	36.07	3	0	
457	Graham Roope	1973	1978	21	860	77	30.71	172	0	–	–	35	0	
458	Frank Hayes	1973	1976	9	244	106*	15.25	0	–	–	–	7	0	
459	Mike Hendrick	1974	1981	30	128	15	6.40	6,208	87	4/28	25.83	25	0	
460	David Lloyd	1974	1975	9	552	214*	42.46	24	0	–	–	11	0	
461	Graham Gooch ‡	1975	1995	118	8,900	333	42.58	2,655	23	3/39	46.47	103	0	
462	David Steele	1975	1976	8	673	106	42.06	88	2	1/1	19.50	7	0	
463	Bob Woolmer	1975	1981	19	1,059	149	33.09	546	4	1/8	74.75	10	0	
464	Phil Edmonds	1975	1987	51	875	64	17.50	12,028	125	7/66	34.18	42	0	
465	Mike Brearley ‡	1976	1981	39	1,442	91	22.88	0	–	–	–	52	0	
466	Mike Selvey	1976	1977	3	15	5*	7.50	492	6	4/41	57.16	1	0	
467	Chris Balderstone	1976	1976	2	39	35	9.75	96	1	1/80	80.00	1	0	
468	Peter Willey	1976	1986	26	1,184	102*	26.90	1,091	7	2/73	65.14	3	0	
469	Geoff Miller	1976	1984	34	1,213	98*	25.80	5,149	60	5/44	30.98	17	0	
470	Graham Barlow	1976	1977	3	17	7*	4.25	0	–	–	–	0	0	
471	John Lever	1976	1986	21	306	53	11.76	4,433	73	7/46	26.72	11	0	
472	Derek Randall	1977	1984	47	2,470	174	33.37	16	0	–	–	31	0	
473	Roger Tolchard	1977	1977	4	129	67	25.80	0	–	–	–	5	0	
474	Ian Botham ‡	1977	1992	102	5,200	208	33.54	21,815	383	8/34	28.40	120	0	
475	Geoff Cope	1977	1978	3	40	22	13.33	864	8	3/102	34.62	1	0	
476	Brian Rose	1977	1981	9	358	70	25.57	0	–	–	–	4	0	
477	Mike Gatting ‡	1978	1995	79	4,409	207	35.55	752	4	1/14	79.25	59	0	
478	Clive Radley	1978	1978	8	481	158	48.10	0	–	–	–	4	0	
479	David Gower ‡	1978	1992	117	8,231	215	44.25	36	1	1/1	20.00	74	0	
480	John Emburey ‡	1978	1995	64	1,713	75	22.53	15,391	147	7/78	38.40	34	0	
481	David Bairstow †	1979	1981	4	125	59	20.83	0	–	–	–	12	1	
482	Alan Butcher	1979	1979	1	34	20	17.00	12	0	–	–	0	0	
483	Graham Dilley	1979	1989	41	521	56	13.35	8,192	138	6/38	29.76	10	0	

== 1980s ==
England Test cricketers who made their debut in the 1980s
Cap	Name	First	Last	Mat	Runs	HS	Avg	Balls	Wkt	BBI	Ave	Ca	St	Ref(s)
Cap	Name	First	Last	Mat	Batting			Bowling				Fielding		Ref(s)
484	Wayne Larkins	1980	1991	13	493	64	20.54	0	–	–	–	8	0	
485	Graham Stevenson	1980	1981	2	28	27*	28.00	312	5	3/111	36.60	0	0	
486	Chris Tavaré	1980	1989	31	1,755	149	32.50	30	0	–	–	20	0	
487	Bill Athey	1980	1988	23	919	123	22.97	0	–	–	–	13	0	
488	Paul Downton †	1981	1988	30	785	74	19.62	0	–	–	–	70	5	
489	Roland Butcher	1981	1981	3	71	32	14.20	0	–	–	–	3	0	
490	Robin Jackman	1981	1982	4	42	17	7.00	1,070	14	4/110	31.78	0	0	
491	Paul Allott	1981	1985	13	213	52*	14.20	2,225	26	6/61	41.69	4	0	
492	Paul Parker	1981	1981	1	13	13	6.50	0	–	–	–	0	0	
493	Geoff Cook	1982	1983	7	203	66	15.61	42	0	–	–	9	0	
494	Allan Lamb ‡	1982	1992	79	4,656	142	36.09	30	1	1/6	23.00	75	0	
495	Derek Pringle	1982	1992	30	695	63	15.50	5,287	70	5/95	35.97	10	0	
496	Ian Greig	1982	1982	2	26	14	6.50	188	4	4/43	28.50	0	0	
497	Eddie Hemmings	1982	1991	16	383	95	22.52	4,437	43	6/58	42.44	5	0	
498	Graeme Fowler	1982	1985	21	1,307	201	35.32	18	0	–	–	10	0	
499	Vic Marks	1982	1984	6	249	83	27.66	1,082	11	3/78	44.00	0	0	
500	Norman Cowans	1982	1985	19	175	36	7.95	3,452	51	6/77	39.27	9	0	
501	Nick Cook	1983	1989	15	179	31	8.52	4,174	52	6/65	32.48	5	0	
502	Neil Foster	1983	1993	29	446	39	11.73	6,261	88	8/107	32.85	7	0	
503	Chris Smith	1983	1986	8	392	91	30.15	102	3	2/31	13.00	5	0	
504	Tony Pigott	1984	1984	1	12	8*	12.00	102	2	2/75	37.50	0	0	
505	Andy Lloyd	1984	1984	1	10	10*	–	0	–	–	–	0	0	
506	Chris Broad	1984	1989	25	1,661	162	39.54	6	0	–	–	10	0	
507	Paul Terry	1984	1984	2	16	8	5.33	0	–	–	–	2	0	
508	Jonathan Agnew	1984	1985	3	10	5	10.00	552	4	2/51	93.25	0	0	
509	Richard Ellison	1984	1986	11	202	41	13.46	2,264	35	6/77	29.94	2	0	
510	Chris Cowdrey ‡	1984	1988	6	101	38	14.42	399	4	2/65	77.25	5	0	
511	Tim Robinson	1984	1989	29	1,601	175	36.38	6	0	–	–	8	0	
512	Arnie Sidebottom	1985	1985	1	2	2	2.00	112	1	1/65	65.00	0	0	
513	Les Taylor	1985	1985	2	1	1*	–	381	4	2/34	44.50	1	0	
514	David Smith	1986	1986	2	80	47	20.00	0	–	–	–	0	0	
515	Greg Thomas	1986	1986	5	83	31*	13.83	774	10	4/70	50.40	0	0	
516	Wilf Slack	1986	1986	3	81	52	13.50	0	–	–	–	3	0	
517	Bruce French †	1986	1988	16	308	59	18.11	0	–	–	–	38	1	
518	Mark Benson	1986	1986	1	51	30	25.50	0	–	–	–	0	0	
519	Neal Radford	1986	1988	3	21	12*	7.00	678	4	2/131	87.75	0	0	
520	Martyn Moxon	1986	1989	10	455	99	28.43	48	0	–	–	10	0	
521	Gladstone Small	1986	1991	17	263	59	15.47	3,927	55	5/48	34.01	9	0	
522	Phillip DeFreitas	1986	1995	44	934	88	14.82	9,838	140	7/70	33.57	14	0	
523	Jack Richards †	1986	1988	8	285	133	21.92	0	–	–	–	20	1	
524	James Whitaker	1986	1986	1	11	11	11.00	0	–	–	–	1	0	
525	Neil Fairbrother	1987	1993	10	219	83	15.64	12	0	–	–	4	0	
526	David Capel	1987	1990	15	374	98	15.58	2,000	21	3/88	50.66	6	0	
527	Paul Jarvis	1988	1993	9	132	29*	10.15	1,912	21	4/107	45.95	2	0	
528	John Childs	1988	1988	2	2	2*	–	516	3	1/13	61.00	1	0	
529	Tim Curtis	1988	1989	5	140	41	15.55	18	0	–	–	3	0	
530	Robin Smith	1988	1996	62	4,236	175	43.67	24	0	–	–	39	0	
531	Rob Bailey	1988	1990	4	119	43	14.87	0	–	–	–	0	0	
532	Matthew Maynard	1988	1994	4	87	35	10.87	0	–	–	–	3	0	
533	Kim Barnett	1988	1989	4	207	80	29.57	36	0	–	–	1	0	
534	David Lawrence	1988	1992	5	60	34	10.00	1,089	18	5/106	37.55	0	0	
535	Phil Newport	1988	1991	3	110	40*	27.50	669	10	4/87	41.70	1	0	
536	Jack Russell †	1988	1998	54	1,897	128*	27.10	0	–	–	–	153	12	
537	Angus Fraser	1989	1998	46	388	32	7.46	10,876	177	8/53	27.32	9	0	
538	Michael Atherton ‡	1989	2001	115	7,728	185*	37.69	408	2	1/20	151.00	83	0	
539	Devon Malcolm	1989	1997	40	236	29	6.05	8,480	128	9/57	37.09	7	0	
540	Alan Igglesden	1989	1994	3	6	3*	3.00	555	6	2/91	54.83	1	0	
541	John Stephenson	1989	1989	1	36	26	18.00	0	–	–	–	0	0	

== 1990s ==
England Test cricketers who made their debut in the 1990s
Cap	Name	First	Last	Mat	Runs	HS	Avg	Balls	Wkt	BBI	Ave	Ca	St	Ref(s)
Cap	Name	First	Last	Mat	Batting			Bowling				Fielding		Ref(s)
542	Nasser Hussain ‡	1990	2004	96	5,764	207	37.18	30	0	–	–	67	0	
543	Alec Stewart ‡†	1990	2003	133	8,463	190	39.54	20	0	–	–	263	14	
544	Chris Lewis	1990	1996	32	1,105	117	23.02	6,852	93	6/111	37.52	25	0	
545	John Morris	1990	1990	3	71	32	23.66	0	–	–	–	3	0	
546	Neil Williams	1990	1990	1	38	38	38.00	246	2	2/148	74.00	0	0	
547	Phil Tufnell	1990	2001	42	153	22*	5.10	11,288	121	7/47	37.68	12	0	
548	Graeme Hick	1991	2001	65	3,383	178	31.32	3,057	23	4/126	56.78	90	0	
549	Mark Ramprakash	1991	2002	52	2,350	154	27.32	895	4	1/2	119.25	39	0	
550	Steve Watkin	1991	1993	3	25	13	5.00	534	11	4/65	27.72	1	0	
551	Richard Illingworth	1991	1995	9	128	28	18.28	1,485	19	4/96	32.36	5	0	
552	Hugh Morris	1991	1991	3	115	44	19.16	0	–	–	–	3	0	
553	Dermot Reeve	1992	1992	3	124	59	24.80	149	2	1/4	30.00	1	0	
554	Ian Salisbury	1992	2000	15	368	50	16.72	2,492	20	4/163	76.95	5	0	
555	Tim Munton	1992	1992	2	25	25*	25.00	405	4	2/22	50.00	0	0	
556	Neil Mallender	1992	1992	2	8	4	2.66	449	10	5/50	21.50	0	0	
557	Paul Taylor	1993	1994	2	34	17*	17.00	288	3	1/18	52.00	0	0	
558	Richard Blakey †	1993	1993	2	7	6	1.75	0	–	–	–	2	0	
559	Andy Caddick	1993	2003	62	861	49*	10.37	13,558	234	7/46	29.91	21	0	
560	Peter Such	1993	1999	11	67	14*	6.09	3,124	37	6/67	33.56	4	0	
561	Mark Ilott	1993	1995	5	28	15	7.00	1,042	12	3/48	45.16	0	0	
562	Mark Lathwell	1993	1993	2	78	33	19.50	0	–	–	–	0	0	
563	Martin McCague	1993	1994	3	21	11	4.20	593	6	4/121	65.00	1	0	
564	Graham Thorpe	1993	2005	100	6,744	200*	44.66	138	0	–	–	105	0	
565	Martin Bicknell	1993	2003	4	45	15	6.42	1,080	14	4/84	38.78	2	0	
566	Steve Rhodes †	1994	1995	11	294	65*	24.50	0	–	–	–	46	3	
567	Craig White	1994	2002	30	1,052	121	24.46	3,959	59	5/32	37.62	14	0	
568	Darren Gough	1994	2003	58	855	65	12.57	11,821	229	6/42	28.39	13	0	
569	John Crawley	1994	2003	37	1,800	156*	34.61	0	–	–	–	29	0	
570	Joey Benjamin	1994	1994	1	0	0	0.00	168	4	4/42	20.00	0	0	
571	Peter Martin	1995	1997	8	115	29	8.84	1,452	17	4/60	34.11	6	0	
572	Dominic Cork	1995	2002	37	864	59	18.00	7,678	131	7/43	29.81	18	0	
573	Jason Gallian	1995	1995	3	74	28	12.33	84	0	–	–	1	0	
574	Nick Knight	1995	2001	17	719	113	23.96	0	–	–	–	26	0	
575	Mike Watkinson	1995	1996	4	167	82*	33.40	672	10	3/64	34.80	1	0	
576	Alan Wells	1995	1995	1	3	3*	3.00	0	–	–	–	0	0	
577	Ronnie Irani	1996	1999	3	86	41	17.20	192	3	1/22	37.33	2	0	
578	Alan Mullally	1996	2001	19	127	24	5.52	4,525	58	5/105	31.24	6	0	
579	Min Patel	1996	1996	2	45	27	22.50	276	1	1/101	180.00	2	0	
580	Mark Ealham	1996	1998	8	210	53*	21.00	1,060	17	4/21	28.70	4	0	
581	Simon Brown	1996	1996	1	11	10*	11.00	198	2	1/60	69.00	1	0	
582	Robert Croft	1996	2001	21	421	37*	16.19	4,619	49	5/95	37.24	10	0	
583	Chris Silverwood	1996	2002	6	29	10	7.25	828	11	5/91	40.36	2	0	
584	Mark Butcher ‡	1997	2004	71	4,288	173*	34.58	901	15	4/42	36.06	61	0	
585	Dean Headley	1997	1999	15	186	31	8.45	3,026	60	6/60	27.85	7	0	
586	Mike Smith	1997	1997	1	4	4*	4.00	138	0	–	–	0	0	
587	Adam Hollioake	1997	1998	4	65	45	10.83	144	2	2/31	33.50	4	0	
588	Ben Hollioake	1997	1998	2	44	28	11.00	252	4	2/105	49.75	2	0	
589	Steve James	1998	1998	2	71	36	17.75	0	–	–	–	0	0	
590	Ashley Giles	1998	2006	54	1,421	59	20.89	12,180	143	5/57	40.60	33	0	
591	Andrew Flintoff ‡	1998	2009	79	3,845	167	31.77	14,951	226	5/58	32.78	52	0	(Note: Andrew Flintoff and Steve Harmison have also played Test cricket for the World XI. Only their records for England are given above.)
592	Alex Tudor	1998	2002	10	229	99*	19.08	1,512	28	5/44	34.39	3	0	
593	Warren Hegg †	1998	1999	2	30	15	7.50	0	–	–	–	8	0	
594	Aftab Habib	1999	1999	2	26	19	8.66	0	–	–	–	0	0	
595	Chris Read †	1999	2007	15	360	55	18.94	0	–	–	–	48	6	
596	Ed Giddins	1999	2000	4	10	7	2.50	444	12	5/15	20.00	0	0	
597	Darren Maddy	1999	2000	3	46	24	11.50	84	0	–	–	4	0	
598	Chris Adams	1999	2000	5	104	31	13.00	120	1	1/42	59.00	6	0	
599	Gavin Hamilton	1999	1999	1	0	0	0.00	90	0	–	–	0	0	
600	Michael Vaughan ‡	1999	2008	82	5,719	197	41.44	978	6	2/71	93.50	44	0	

== 2000s ==
England Test cricketers who made their debut in the 2000s
Cap	Name	First	Last	Mat	Runs	HS	Avg	Balls	Wkt	BBI	Ave	Ca	St	Ref(s)
Cap	Name	First	Last	Mat	Batting			Bowling				Fielding		Ref(s)
601	Chris Schofield	2000	2000	2	67	57	22.33	108	0	–	–	0	0	
602	Matthew Hoggard	2000	2008	67	473	38	7.27	13,909	248	7/61	30.50	24	0	
603	Marcus Trescothick ‡	2000	2006	76	5,825	219	43.79	300	1	1/34	155.00	95	0	
604	Ryan Sidebottom	2001	2010	22	313	31	15.65	4,812	79	7/49	28.24	5	0	
605	Ian Ward	2001	2001	5	129	39	16.12	0	–	–	–	1	0	
606	Usman Afzaal	2001	2001	3	83	54	16.60	54	1	1/49	49.00	0	0	
607	James Ormond	2001	2001	2	38	18	12.66	372	2	1/70	92.50	0	0	
608	Richard Dawson	2001	2003	7	114	19*	11.40	1,116	11	4/134	61.54	3	0	
609	James Foster †	2001	2002	7	226	48	25.11	0	–	–	–	17	1	
610	Simon Jones	2002	2005	18	205	44	15.76	2,821	59	6/53	28.23	4	0	
611	Steve Harmison	2002	2009	62	742	49*	12.16	13,192	222	7/12	31.94	7	0	
612	Rob Key	2002	2005	15	775	221	31.00	0	–	–	–	11	0	
613	James Anderson	2003	2024	188	1,353	81	8.96	40,037	704	7/42	26.45	107	0	
614	Anthony McGrath	2003	2003	4	201	81	40.20	102	4	3/16	14.00	3	0	
615	Richard Johnson	2003	2003	3	59	26	14.75	547	16	6/33	17.18	0	0	
616	James Kirtley	2003	2003	4	32	12	5.33	1,079	19	6/34	29.52	3	0	
617	Ed Smith	2003	2003	3	87	64	17.40	0	–	–	–	5	0	
618	Kabir Ali	2003	2003	1	10	9	5.00	216	5	3/80	27.20	0	0	
619	Gareth Batty	2003	2016	9	149	38	14.90	1,714	15	3/55	60.93	3	0	
620	Rikki Clarke	2003	2003	2	96	55	32.00	174	4	2/7	15.00	1	0	
621	Martin Saggers	2003	2004	3	1	1	0.33	493	7	2/29	35.28	1	0	
622	Paul Collingwood	2003	2011	68	4,259	206	40.56	1,905	17	3/23	59.88	96	0	
623	Geraint Jones †	2004	2006	34	1,172	100	23.91	0	–	–	–	128	5	
624	Andrew Strauss ‡	2004	2012	100	7,037	177	40.91	0	–	–	–	121	0	
625	Ian Bell	2004	2015	118	7,727	235	42.69	108	1	1/33	76.00	100	0	
626	Kevin Pietersen ‡	2005	2014	104	8,181	227	47.28	1,311	10	3/52	88.60	62	0	
627	Shaun Udal	2005	2006	4	109	33*	18.16	596	8	4/14	43.00	3	0	
628	Liam Plunkett	2005	2014	13	238	55*	15.86	2,659	41	5/64	37.46	3	0	
629	Ian Blackwell	2006	2006	1	4	4	4.00	114	0	–	–	0	0	
630	Alastair Cook ‡	2006	2018	161	12,472	294	45.35	18	1	1/6	7.00	175	0	
631	Monty Panesar	2006	2013	50	220	26	4.88	12,475	167	6/37	34.71	10	0	
632	Owais Shah	2006	2009	6	269	88	26.90	30	0	–	–	2	0	
633	Sajid Mahmood	2006	2007	8	81	34	8.10	1,130	20	4/22	38.10	0	0	
634	Jon Lewis	2006	2006	1	27	20	13.50	246	3	3/68	40.66	0	0	
635	Matt Prior †	2007	2014	79	4,099	131*	40.18	0	–	–	–	243	13	
636	Chris Tremlett	2007	2013	12	113	25*	10.27	2,902	53	6/48	27.00	4	0	
637	Ravi Bopara	2007	2012	13	575	143	31.94	434	1	1/39	290.00	6	0	
638	Stuart Broad	2007	2023	167	3,662	169	18.03	33,698	604	8/15	27.68	55	0	
639	Tim Ambrose †	2008	2009	11	447	102	29.80	0	–	–	–	31	0	
640	Darren Pattinson	2008	2008	1	21	13	10.50	181	2	2/95	48.00	0	0	
641	Graeme Swann	2008	2013	60	1,370	85	22.09	15,349	255	6/65	29.96	54	0	
642	Amjad Khan	2009	2009	1	–	–	–	174	1	1/111	122.00	0	0	
643	Tim Bresnan	2009	2013	23	575	91	26.13	4,674	72	5/48	32.73	8	0	
644	Graham Onions	2009	2012	9	30	17*	10.00	1,606	32	5/38	29.90	0	0	
645	Jonathan Trott	2009	2015	52	3,835	226	44.08	708	5	1/5	80.00	29	0	

== 2010s ==
England Test cricketers who made their debut in the 2010s
Cap	Name	First	Last	Mat	Runs	HS	Avg	Balls	Wkt	BBI	Ave	Ca	St	Ref(s)
Cap	Name	First	Last	Mat	Batting			Bowling				Fielding		Ref(s)
646	Michael Carberry	2010	2014	6	345	60	28.75	0	–	–	–	7	0	
647	Steven Finn	2010	2016	36	279	56	11.16	6,412	125	6/79	30.40	8	0	
648	James Tredwell	2010	2015	2	45	37	22.50	786	11	4/47	29.18	2	0	
649	Eoin Morgan	2010	2012	16	700	130	30.43	0	–	–	–	11	0	
650	Ajmal Shahzad	2010	2010	1	5	5	5.00	102	4	3/45	15.75	2	0	
651	Samit Patel	2012	2015	6	151	42	16.77	858	7	2/27	60.14	3	0	
652	Jonny Bairstow †	2012	2024	100	6,042	167*	36.39	0	–	–	–	242	14	
653	James Taylor	2012	2016	7	312	76	26.00	0	–	–	–	7	0	
654	Nick Compton	2012	2016	16	775	117	28.70	0	–	–	–	7	0	
655	**Joe Root** ‡	2012	2026	169	14,278	262	50.45	6,332	74	5/8	48.09	220	0	
656	Simon Kerrigan	2013	2013	1	1	1*	–	48	0	–	–	0	0	
657	Chris Woakes	2013	2025	62	2,034	137*	25.11	11,219	192	6/17	29.61	31	0	
658	Ben Stokes ‡	2013	2026	122	7,273	258	34.46	14,085	252	6/22	30.98	115	0	
659	Gary Ballance	2014	2017	23	1,498	156	37.45	12	0	–	–	22	0	(Note: Gary Ballance has also played Test cricket for Zimbabwe. Only his record for England is given above.)
660	Scott Borthwick	2014	2014	1	5	4	2.50	78	4	3/33	20.50	2	0	
661	Boyd Rankin	2014	2014	1	13	13	6.50	125	1	1/47	81.00	0	0	(Note: Boyd Rankin has also played Test cricket for Ireland. Only his record for England is given above.)
662	Moeen Ali	2014	2023	68	3,094	155*	28.12	12,610	204	6/53	37.31	40	0	
663	Chris Jordan	2014	2015	8	180	35	18.00	1,530	21	4/18	35.80	14	0	
664	Sam Robson	2014	2014	7	336	127	30.54	0	–	–	–	5	0	
665	Jos Buttler †	2014	2022	57	2,907	152	31.94	0	–	–	–	153	1	
666	Adam Lyth	2015	2015	7	265	107	20.38	6	0	–	–	8	0	
667	Mark Wood	2015	2025	38	811	52	15.59	6,610	119	6/37	30.79	8	0	
668	Adil Rashid	2015	2019	19	540	61	19.28	3,816	60	5/49	39.83	4	0	
669	Alex Hales	2015	2016	11	573	94	27.28	18	0	–	–	8	0	
670	James Vince	2016	2018	13	548	83	24.90	24	0	–	–	8	0	
671	Jake Ball	2016	2017	4	67	31	8.37	612	3	1/47	114.33	1	0	
672	**Ben Duckett**	2016	2026	49	3,364	182	38.22	0	–	–	–	37	0	
673	Zafar Ansari	2016	2016	3	49	32	9.80	408	5	2/76	55.00	1	0	
674	Haseeb Hameed	2016	2022	10	439	82	24.38	0	–	–	–	7	0	
675	Keaton Jennings	2016	2019	17	781	146*	25.19	73	0	–	–	17	0	
676	Liam Dawson	2016	2025	4	110	66*	22.00	898	8	2/34	54.75	2	0	
677	Dawid Malan	2017	2022	22	1,074	140	27.53	222	2	2/33	65.50	13	0	
678	Toby Roland-Jones	2017	2017	4	82	25	20.50	536	17	5/57	19.64	0	0	
679	Tom Westley	2017	2017	5	193	59	24.12	24	0	–	–	1	0	
680	Mark Stoneman	2017	2018	11	526	56	27.68	0	–	–	–	1	0	
681	Craig Overton	2017	2022	8	182	41*	15.16	1,472	21	3/14	36.19	7	0	
682	Tom Curran	2017	2018	2	66	39	33.00	396	2	1/65	100.00	0	0	
683	Mason Crane	2018	2018	1	6	4	3.00	288	1	1/193	193.00	0	0	
684	Jack Leach	2018	2024	39	498	92	13.45	9,402	142	5/66	34.07	18	0	
685	Dom Bess	2018	2021	14	319	57	22.78	2,502	36	5/30	33.97	3	0	
686	Sam Curran	2018	2021	24	815	78	24.69	3,091	47	4/58	35.51	5	0	
687	**Ollie Pope** ‡†	2018	2025	64	3,732	205	34.55	0	–	–	–	79	1	
688	Rory Burns	2018	2022	32	1,789	133	30.32	0	–	–	–	24	0	
689	Ben Foakes †	2018	2024	25	1,139	113*	29.20	0	–	–	–	69	10	
690	Joe Denly	2019	2020	15	827	94	29.53	390	2	2/42	109.50	7	0	
691	Jason Roy	2019	2019	5	187	72	18.70	0	–	–	–	1	0	
692	Olly Stone	2019	2024	5	102	20	11.33	610	17	3/29	23.52	2	0	
693	**Jofra Archer**	2019	2026	23	364	51	12.13	4,529	83	6/45	28.63	4	0	
694	Dom Sibley	2019	2021	22	1,042	133*	28.94	6	0	–	–	12	0	
695	**Zak Crawley**	2019	2026	64	3,586	267	31.18	0	–	–	–	70	0	

== 2020s ==
England Test cricketers who made their debut in the 2020s
Cap	Name	First	Last	Mat	Runs	HS	Avg	Balls	Wkt	BBI	Ave	Ca	St	Ref(s)
Cap	Name	First	Last	Mat	Batting			Bowling				Fielding		Ref(s)
697	**Dan Lawrence**	2021	2026	17	858	91	29.58	304	5	2/17	30.00	10	0	
698	James Bracey †	2021	2021	2	8	8	2.66	–	–	–	–	6	0	
699	**Ollie Robinson**	2021	2026	24	498	58	14.64	4,479	104	5/39	19.25	8	0	
700	Sam Billings †	2022	2022	3	66	36	22.00	–	–	–	–	8	0	
701	Alex Lees	2022	2022	10	453	67	23.84	–	–	–	–	5	0	
702	**Matthew Fisher**	2022	2026	2	50	50*	50.00	404	6	3/58	31.83	1	0	
703	Saqib Mahmood	2022	2022	2	52	49	52.00	366	6	2/21	22.83	1	0	
704	**Matthew Potts**	2022	2026	11	105	21	10.50	2,191	36	4/13	33.36	9	0	
705	Matt Parkinson	2022	2022	1	8	8	8.00	450	4	2/98	77.50	2	0	
706	Jamie Overton	2022	2025	2	106	97	35.33	222	2	1/61	73.00	0	0	
707	**Harry Brook**	2022	2026	41	3,610	317	53.08	180	1	1/25	127.00	66	0	
708	**Will Jacks**	2022	2026	6	234	47	21.27	721	12	6/161	46.16	1	0	
709	Liam Livingstone	2022	2022	1	16	9	16.00	–	–	–	–	0	0	
710	Rehan Ahmed	2022	2024	5	103	28	10.30	1,038	22	5/48	31.22	3	0	
711	**Josh Tongue**	2023	2026	15	133	30*	7.82	2,918	76	5/45	26.32	6	0	
712	Tom Hartley	2024	2024	5	185	36	18.50	1,504	22	7/62	36.13	2	0	
713	**Shoaib Bashir**	2024	2026	21	106	14	7.57	4,427	71	6/81	39.42	6	0	
714	**Gus Atkinson**	2024	2026	21	587	118	19.56	3,457	83	7/45	25.34	9	0	
715	**Jamie Smith** †	2024	2026	25	1,549	184*	39.71	–	–	–	–	77	2	
716	Josh Hull	2024	2024	1	9	7*	9.00	102	3	3/53	30.33	0	0	
717	**Brydon Carse**	2024	2026	14	357	56	17.85	2,699	58	6/42	30.18	14	0	
718	**Jacob Bethell**	2024	2026	9	579	154	34.05	388	8	3/26	31.87	11	0	
719	Sam Cook	2025	2025	1	–	–	–	186	1	1/72	119.00	0	0	
720	**Emilio Gay**	2026	2026	6	271	60	24.63	–	–	–	–	8	0	
721	**Sonny Baker**	2026	2026	1	4	4	4.00	205	3	2/94	53.66	0	0	
722	**Jordan Cox**	2026	2026	4	254	73	42.33	–	–	–	–	9	1	
723	**James Rew** †	2026	2026	1	39	24	19.50	–	–	–	–	3	0	

== Shirt number history ==
Since the 2019 Ashes series, there has been an introduction of names and numbers on all Test players' shirts in an effort to engage new fans and help identify the players. This forms part of the inaugural ICC World Test Championship, a league competition between the top nine Test nations spread over a two-year period, culminating in a Final between the top two teams.

S/N	Current	Past
1	Ollie Robinson	
2	–	Alex Lees (2022)
6	Zak Crawley	
7	–	Sam Billings (2022)
8	–	Stuart Broad (2019–2023)
9	–	James Anderson (2019–2024)
17	Ben Duckett	
18	–	Moeen Ali (2019–2023)
19	–	Chris Woakes (2019–2025)
20	–	Jason Roy (2019)
22	Jofra Archer	
23	–	Liam Livingstone (2022)
24	–	Joe Denly (2019)
25	–	Saqib Mahmood (2022)
26	Olly Stone	
27	–	Rory Burns (2019–2022)
29	–	Dawid Malan (2021–2022)
32	–	Craig Overton (2021–2022)
33	Mark Wood	
35	Matthew Potts	
37	Gus Atkinson	
39	Jamie Smith	
40	–	Matthew Fisher (2022)
47	Josh Hull	Dom Bess (2020–2021)
49	–	Alex Lees (2022)
50	–	Ben Foakes (2021–2024)
51	–	Jonny Bairstow (2019–2024)
52	Emilio Gay	Dom Sibley (2019–2021)
53	Rehan Ahmed	
55	Ben Stokes	
56	Josh Tongue	Zak Crawley (2019–2022)
57	–	Ollie Robinson (2021–2024)
58	–	Sam Curran (2019–2021)
60	Sonny Baker	
63	–	Jos Buttler (2019–2022)
66	Joe Root	
67	Shoaib Bashir	
68	Dan Lawrence	
70	–	Matt Parkinson (2022)
74	Matthew Fisher	
75	–	Jamie Overton (2022–2025)
77	Jack Leach	
79	Tom Hartley	
80	Ollie Pope	
82	Jacob Bethell	Matthew Potts (2022)
83	Liam Dawson	
85	Will Jacks	
86	Sam Cook	
88	Harry Brook	
89	James Rew	
90	–	James Bracey (2021)
92	Brydon Carse	
93	Jordan Cox	Alex Lees (2022)
97	–	Haseeb Hameed (2021–2022)
