= John Nash (cricket administrator) =

English cricket administrator

John Nash

John Henry Nash (1906 – 7 April 1977, in Pudsey, near Leeds) was an English cricket administrator.

John Nash was Secretary of Yorkshire County Cricket Club from 1931 until his retirement in 1971, when he was succeeded by Joe Lister. He became one of the most respected figures in cricket, making a host of friends throughout the world. He joined the clerical staff at Yorkshire in 1922 and in his time as secretary he rarely saw a full day's cricket because of the complexity of administrative duties, but his efficiency became a by-word. He was joint-manager with Brigadier M. A. Green of the M.C.C. team captained by F. R. Brown that toured Australia and New Zealand in 1950-51.

Outside of cricket, he led a full life. He was an organist of great ability, playing for many years at Farsley Parish Church, where he was also secretary of the Church Council. He died from a heart attack in April 1977.
