= Sam Cook (cricketer, born 1921) =

English cricketer

Personal information
- Full name: Cecil Cook
- Born: 23 August 1921; Tetbury, Gloucestershire, England
- Died: 4 September 1996 (aged 75); Tetbury, Gloucestershire, England
- Batting: Right-handed
- Bowling: Slow left-arm orthodox

International information
- National side: England
- Only Test (cap 317): 7 June 1947 v South Africa

Domestic team information
- Years: Team
- 1946–1964: Gloucestershire

Umpiring information
- FC umpired: 297 (1965–1986)
- LA umpired: 254 (1965–1990)

Career statistics
Competition	Test	First-class
Matches	1	506
Runs scored	4	1,965
Batting average	2.00	5.41
100s/50s	0/0	0/0
Top score	4	35*
Balls bowled	180	106,366
Wickets	0	1,782
Bowling average	–	20.52
5 wickets in innings	–	99
10 wickets in match	–	15
Best bowling	–	9/42
Catches/stumpings	0/–	153/–
- Source: Cricinfo, 17 December 2018

Cecil "Sam" Cook (23 August 1921 – 4 September 1996) was an English first-class cricketer who played for Gloucestershire County Cricket Club and in one Test match for the England cricket team.

== Life and career ==
Born in Tetbury, Gloucestershire, Cook was a small and stocky slow left-arm spinner, who emerged unexpectedly after World War II when Gloucestershire had lost Tom Goddard’s former partner, Reg Sinfield. Wally Hammond saw him in the nets during the spring, and with great expectations that were later amply fulfilled, he immediately recruited Cook. Cook, who was never known by his given name, took a wicket with his first ball in first-class cricket, and claimed 133 wickets in the 1946 season, when he played in the Test Trial. Not a great spinner of the ball, Cook relied on accuracy and flight: if he lacked penetration as a bowler, he was also very rarely mastered. In the following year with the Bristol pitch – which had caused little satisfaction due to its tendency to be either a spinners’ paradise (as in 1939) or a batsman's paradise (as in 1946) – being reconditioned with a sand dressing, Cook offered superb support to Goddard to form the most difficult bowling attack in the country.

Cook was called into the England team to play the South Africans on a batting pitch at Trent Bridge in 1947, after taking six South African wickets in the second innings of the MCC match in May. However, in the Test match, he took no wickets for 127 runs, scored 0 and 4, and was never picked again. The Kent fast bowler Jack Martin, who had done equally well in the MCC match, was also picked for the Trent Bridge Test, also fared badly, and was likewise discarded, never to appear in Test cricket again. In 1948, with the Bristol pitch dressed with loam instead of sand, Cook declined considerably and never threatened the superbly-skilled Australian batsmen, and it took him until August 1949 to recapture any sort of form.

Cook took 139 wickets in 1950, but by this time Johnny Wardle, Malcolm Hilton, and later Tony Lock – all far better batsmen and fielders – were able to prevent him from having the slightest chance of returning to Test cricket. Owing to the loss of Goddard, Cook faltered a little between 1951 and 1955, but the wet summer and dry spring of 1956 allowed him to form a combination with Bomber Wells that led Cook to his most successful season with 149 wickets for less than fifteen runs apiece, including an amazing ten for 35 against Worcestershire and thirteen for 121 against Nottinghamshire. The following two seasons were moderate, but with the newly found spinning riches of John Mortimore and David Allen, Gloucestershire acquired the most formidable bowling attack in the country during the brilliant summer of 1959, with Cook "making full use of his wealth of experience". In this period, Gloucestershire, as in the days of Parker, Goddard, and Sinfield, often played three spinners, right up to the time when Cook retired in 1964. However, despite heading the first-class bowling averages for the only time in 1962, Cook's extreme weakness with the bat and in the field saw him left out for many matches even in that season and on grassier pitches, the switch in emphasis to seam bowling made things even tougher for Cook as he grew older.

In all first-class cricket, Cook took 1,782 wickets. Not known for his batting skills, he scored fewer than 2,000 first-class runs and never reached 40 in an innings. After retirement, he stood as a first-class umpire until 1986.

Sam Cook died in his hometown of Tetbury on 4 September 1996, at the age of 75.
