= Barry Howard (cricketer) =

English cricketer (1926–2019)

Barry John Howard (21 May 1926 – 27 April 2019) was an English cricketer active from 1947 to 1953 who played for Lancashire in 35 matches as a righthanded batsman. He was born in Hyde, Cheshire, on 21 May 1926. Howard was awarded his county cap in 1947, his debut season. He scored 1,232 runs in first-class cricket with a highest score of 114, one of three centuries. He became president of Lancashire County Cricket Club 1987 to 1988. His father was Rupert Howard and his elder brother was Nigel Howard.

== Sources ==
- Barry Howard at CricketArchive
- Barry Howard at ESPNcricinfo
- Playfair Cricket Annual – 1948 edition
