= Fred Ridgway =

English cricketer

Personal information
- Full name: Frederick Ridgway
- Born: 10 August 1923; Stockport, Cheshire
- Died: 26 September 2015 (aged 92); Maidstone, Kent
- Batting: Right-handed
- Bowling: Right-arm fast-medium
- Role: Bowler

International information
- National side: England
- Test debut (cap 365): 2 November 1951 v India
- Last Test: 6 February 1952 v India

Domestic team information
- Years: Team
- 1946–1961: Kent
- 1951–1952: MCC

Career statistics
Competition	Test	First-class
Matches	5	341
Runs scored	49	4,081
Batting average	8.16	11.00
100s/50s	0/0	0/9
Top score	24	94
Balls bowled	793	56,616
Wickets	7	1,069
Bowling average	54.14	23.74
5 wickets in innings	0	41
10 wickets in match	0	6
Best bowling	4/83	8/39
Catches/stumpings	3/–	234/–
- Source: CricInfo, 7 January 2009

Frederick Ridgway (10 August 1923 – 26 September 2015) was an English professional cricketer who played in five Test matches for the England cricket team on the 1951–52 tour of India. Ridgway played county cricket as a fast bowler for Kent County Cricket Club between 1946 and 1961.

== Life and career ==
Ridgway was born at Stockport in Cheshire on 10 August 1923. As a county cricketer, Ridgway, although not appearing a likely successful pace bowler because of his slight build, was the mainstay of Kent County Cricket Club's opening attack for a decade after World War II, except on the rare occasions that Jack Martin could get away from business. Ridgway did not play regularly in 1946, but the following year he jumped into prominence with 12 for 86 on a rain-affected pitch against Yorkshire.

Though in 1948 he was badly affected by injury, 1949 proved to be Ridgway's best year, for he took 105 wickets for 22.88 runs each, which ranked him as the fourth-best pace bowler in the country after Bedser, Gladwin and Les Jackson. Ridgway's most notable performance was on the featherbed Trent Bridge wicket, where he took six for 79 in the first innings, and paved the way for an easy Kent victory. Apart from teammate Doug Wright in the second innings, no visiting bowler at Trent Bridge bettered those figures all year, but Ridgway's most notable feat that year was his striking consistency: with only one haul of eight or more in a match he still took 90 wickets in 20 county games. Moreover, playing against Sussex, Ridgway "shared in a record partnership of 161 for the ninth wicket" with Brian Edrich. This partnership, just under half the total of 379, was made in a losing cause.

Although Ridgway did not play in any of the Tests that year, he was regarded as a contender for honours but, in 1950, injury again took its toll. Career-best figures of eight for 39, however, against Nottinghamshire at the tail end of the season, were followed by an impressive 1951, where he took over 90 wickets. With Alec Bedser amongst others declining to tour India, Ridgway was a natural choice. He was one of seven players who made their Test debut on that trip where he opened the bowling with Brian Statham. Ridgway took 41 wickets at an average of 26.04 in 16 first-class matches on the tour, but only seven wickets at 54.14 in the five Tests.

Injury again troubled him in 1952 and 1955, and he did not return to his best form until 1956, when support at last coming from David Halfyard, Ridgway took 82 wickets and, two years later, had his second-highest aggregate with 98 wickets at 14.26 runs, lifting Kent to their highest County Championship position since 1947. Injuries again restricted him severely in 1959 and 1960, after which he retired from first-class cricket.

== Football ==
Ridgway was also a footballer, playing as a semi-professional in the post war period for Ramsgate F.C. in the Kent League.

== Later life ==
Ridgway lived in retirement in Barming, Maidstone, Kent. He died on 26 September 2015 at the age of 92.
