= M. M. Naidu =

Indian cricket umpire (1911–1991)

Personal information
- Born: 28 October 1911
- Died: 13 December 1991 (aged 80)

Umpiring information
- Tests umpired: 1 (1951)
- Source: ESPNcricinfo, 13 July 2013

M. M. Naidu (28 October 1911 – 13 December 1991) was an Indian cricket umpire. He stood in one Test match, India vs. England, in 1951.

== See also ==
- List of Test cricket umpires
- English cricket team in India in 1951–52
