= Rupert Howard =

English cricketer

Rupert Howard OBE, (17 April 1889 – 10 September 1967) was an English cricketer active from 1922 to 1933 who played for Lancashire. He was born in Ashton-under-Lyne and died in Manchester. He appeared in eight first-class matches as a righthanded batsman, scoring 166 runs with a highest score of 88* and held four catches. He was the father of Nigel and Barry Howard
