= Dick Spooner =

English cricketer

Personal information
- Full name: Richard Thompson Spooner
- Born: 30 December 1919; Thornaby-on-Tees, North Riding, Yorkshire, England
- Died: 20 December 1997 (aged 77); Torquay, Devon, England
- Batting: Left-handed
- Role: Wicketkeeper-batsman

International information
- National side: England

Career statistics
Competition	Tests	First-class
Matches	7	359
Runs scored	354	13,851
Batting average	27.23	27.26
100s/50s	0/3	12/64
Top score	92	168*
Balls bowled	–	54
Wickets	–	–
Bowling average	–	–
5 wickets in innings	–	–
10 wickets in match	–	–
Best bowling	–	–
Catches/stumpings	10/2	589/178
- Source: Cricinfo, 22 July 2021

Richard Thompson Spooner (30 December 1919 – 20 December 1997) was an English cricketer who played for Warwickshire and England.

A latecomer who did not play first-class cricket until he was 28, Spooner was a quick-witted left-handed batsman who could open the innings or bat further down the order, and a reliable wicket-keeper whose opportunities at Test level were limited because he played in the same era as Godfrey Evans who was considered the best wicket-keeper of all time during their playing days.

== Life and career ==
Spooner was born in Thornaby-on-Tees in the North Riding of Yorkshire. He played Minor Counties cricket for Durham in 1946 and 1947, and moved straight into the first eleven at Warwickshire for the 1948 season. His batting took a while to develop, but he scored more than 1,000 runs in 1950 and was chosen for the Commonwealth XI which toured India in 1950–51. He did well both as batsman and wicket-keeper, but had to return early through illness.

But the following season, 1951, he jumped right to the front rank of wicketkeeper-batsmen, regularly opening the innings for Warwickshire and scoring more than 1,700 runs, with four centuries. Warwickshire won the County Championship for only the second time, and Spooner was picked for the 1951–52 MCC tour of India, Pakistan and Ceylon under Nigel Howard, from which several England regulars, including Evans, absented themselves. There, he played in all five Tests against India, opening the innings in most of them and scoring 319 runs with an average of 35. His batting ability probably won him selection for the Tests ahead of Don Brennan, the other wicketkeeper on the tour. In the third Test on a dead pitch at Eden Gardens, Calcutta, he top-scored in both England innings, with 71 in the first innings and his Test-best of 92 in the second. He also scored 168 not out in the match against Pakistan in Lahore after MCC trailed by 174 on the first innings.

This international form was not enough, though, to earn Spooner selection in the home series against India in 1952, and he made only two further Test appearances. On the English tour of the West Indies in 1953–54, he replaced the injured Evans for the fourth Test on another lifeless pitch at Port of Spain, Trinidad. And finally in 1955, in the final Test at The Oval against South Africa, he won a home Test cap, again when Evans was injured (though Arthur McIntyre had been Evans' replacement in the fourth Test). This final Test, in which England won the series 3–2 late on the last scheduled afternoon, was not a total personal success: Spooner conceded no byes, but failed to score in either innings.

In fact, Spooner's batting declined noticeably after the high point of 1951. He made 1,000 runs in each of the next four seasons, though at a lower average, but by the later 1950s he was batting further down the order and averaging, at best, in the low 20s. After a poor season in 1959, he retired.

Spooner became a groundsman in Devon. He died in Torquay in December 1997 at the age of 77.
