= Balkrishna Mohoni =

Indian cricket umpire (1901–1980)

Personal information
- Full name: Balkrishna Janardan Mohoni
- Born: 15 April 1901; Poona, India
- Died: 7 April 1980 (aged 78); Pune, India

Umpiring information
- Tests umpired: 11 (1949–1956)
- Source: ESPNcricinfo, 13 July 2013

Balkrishna Mohoni (15 April 1901 – 7 April 1980) was an Indian cricket umpire. He stood in eleven Test matches between 1949 and 1956. Mohoni played 11 first-class matches for Maharashtra, between 1934/35 and 1941/42.

== See also ==
- List of Test cricket umpires
