= Roy Tattersall =

English Test and County cricketer (1922–2011)

Personal information
- Full name: Roy Tattersall
- Born: 17 August 1922; Tonge Moor, Bolton, Lancashire, England
- Died: 9 December 2011 (aged 89); Kidderminster, Worcestershire, England
- Batting: Left-handed
- Bowling: Right-arm off break

International information
- National side: England
- Test debut: 2 February 1951 v Australia
- Last Test: 15 June 1954 v Pakistan

Career statistics
Competition	Test	First-class
Matches	16	328
Runs scored	50	2,040
Batting average	5.00	9.35
100s/50s	0/0	0/1
Top score	10*	58
Balls bowled	4,228	71,133
Wickets	58	1,369
Bowling average	26.08	18.03
5 wickets in innings	4	99
10 wickets in match	1	18
Best bowling	7/52	9/40
Catches/stumpings	8/–	146/–
- Source: ESPNcricinfo, 30 December 2021

Roy Tattersall (17 August 1922 – 9 December 2011) was an English cricketer who played for Lancashire and played sixteen Tests for England as a specialist off spin bowler. He was born at Tonge Moor, Bolton, Lancashire, England.

Tattersall had an unusual style, quite different from the orthodox Jim Laker, who kept him out of a Test place for most of his career. Tattersall held his index finger around the seam of the ball and this allowed him to bowl a carefully disguised away-swinger to supplement his sharp off-break. He was rather faster than Laker, and this served to increase his penetration on the many wet wickets of his home county. Of small account as a batsman, he did nonetheless help Reg Simpson in a tenth wicket stand of 74 which helped to give England its first victory over Australia since their record win at The Oval in 1938.

== Early career ==
Tattersall, a late developer, began his first-class cricket career in 1948, at a time when English bowling was weak because World War II had decimated their pre-war pace attack. He first played for Lancashire in 1948 as a medium fast bowler, taking 66 Second XI wickets. He did not establish himself until 1950 after Roberts, Price and Nutter had left the staff and he changed to bowling mainly off-breaks, something he developed in Minor County cricket. That year, largely as a result of groundsmen at Old Trafford deciding to eliminate watering of the pitch, Tattersall consistently had pitches tailor-made for him and he did not disappoint, being the leading wicket-taker in first-class cricket with 193 victims for under 14 apiece. This won him the inaugural Cricket Writers' Club Young Cricketer of the Year award. Although he was not risked in the Tests against a powerful West Indian batting line-up, Tattersall was chosen as a reinforcement for the 1950–51 Ashes series that winter. He did modestly in Australia, but bowled well enough on the more helpful New Zealand pitches to establish himself in the Test team for fourteen consecutive matches.

== Test career ==
Tattersall held his place throughout the 1951 Test series against South Africa, taking 12 for 101 on his home pitch. In addition, he claimed eight for 51 for the Marylebone Cricket Club (MCC) against them. Tattersall went to India that winter, and on a "biting" pitch at Kanpur, he took eight wickets for 125 runs and helped England gain their only victory of the series. However, his being used as a stock bowler delivering 246 subcontinent overs in eight innings, affected his performances, and Tattersall was never the same bowler again. Returning home he found that Jim Laker, Johnny Wardle and Roly Jenkins were ahead of him in the selectors' eyes, despite taking over 100 wickets every year until 1957. Tattersall made only two further appearances in Test cricket: in 1953 against Australia and in 1954 against Pakistan.

== County cricket ==
Tattersall, however, bowled in excellent form for Lancashire right up to 1957; taking 100 County Championship wickets every year except 1956, when after an irresistible start, he unaccountably lost form. In the wet summer of 1958. he failed to reach 100 wickets for the first time since 1949. The eminent Lancashire cricket writer, John Kay, felt Tattersall the victim of inconsistent policy at Old Trafford. In 1956, he was left out in mid-season, a move that probably cost the county the championship. Nonetheless, it was a surprise to see Tattersall and Malcolm Hilton dropped at the beginning of 1959, for the leg-spinner Tommy Greenhough. Although Tattersall was recalled at the beginning of the 1960 season, he did not do well enough to keep his place after May.

He and Hilton, however, were rewarded for their service to the county in the 1950s, with a remarkably productive joint benefit with Hilton in a Roses match at Old Trafford that was watched by over seventy four thousand spectators, with 34,000 on the first day alone. Neither however played in the game, but were consigned to Lancashire's simultaneous 2nd XI match by Cyril Washbrook. Tattersall was not re-engaged by the county for 1961, but did play for the MCC against his former county (in Lancashire's Centenary Match) with remarkable success, taking six for 63 in the first innings on an unhelpful wicket.

In 1961, Tattersall endured a poor season as a professional for Kidderminster in the Birmingham League, but was engaged by Worcestershire for 1962. Aged over forty, Tattersall was only modestly successful for their Second XI. He played his last match in 1963.
