= Buck Divecha =

Indian Test Cricketer

- Buck Divecha in 1952

Personal information
- Full name: Ramesh Vithaldas Divecha
- Born: 18 October 1927; Kadakvadi, British India
- Died: 19 February 2003 (aged 75); Mumbai, Maharashtra, India
- Batting: Right-handed
- Bowling: Right-arm fast-medium; Right-arm off-break

International information
- National side: India
- Test debut (cap 57): 30 December 1951 v England
- Last Test: 28 November 1952 v Pakistan

Career statistics
Competition	Test	First-class
Matches	5	61
Runs scored	60	1,424
Batting average	12.00	20.34
100s/50s	0/0	0/5
Top score	26	92
Balls bowled	1,044	12,782
Wickets	11	217
Bowling average	32.81	24.89
5 wickets in innings	0	9
10 wickets in match	0	0
Best bowling	3/102	8/74
Catches/stumpings	5/–	36/–
- Source: CricketArchive, 3 September 2022

Ramesh Vithaldas 'Buck' Divecha (18 October 1927 – 19 February 2003) was an Indian Test cricketer. Divecha was a right-arm bowler who bowled fast-medium or off-breaks, and a useful batsman.

Divecha was born in a Gujarati family. In 1942 while studying in Wilson College he was arrested in connection with the Quit India movement. He was not charged, and he took no active part in politics after that. His father V.J. Divecha was a club cricketer, President of the Bombay Cricket Association and the Vice President of the Board of Control for Cricket in India.

While studying at Worcester College, Oxford, Divecha played four seasons of cricket for Oxford University and earned blues in 1950 and 1951. He appeared for Northamptonshire against the Australians in 1948 and played Minor Counties cricket for Oxfordshire.

Divecha toured England in 1952 and took 50 wickets. He took a hat-trick against Surrey and a career best 8 for 74 against Glamorgan in the next match. He played Tests against England in 1951–52 and 1952, and Pakistan in 1952–53 but achieved little.

Divecha's career in Indian domestic cricket was far shorter than that in England. He played one Ranji Trophy match for Bombay in 1951–52, one for Madhya Pradesh in 1954–55 and four for Saurashtra in 1962–63. In these six matches he took 22 wickets at 27.50. After his early retirement from cricket, he became a prominent golf player.

Divecha took an M.A. from Oxford. He was an executive with Burmah Shell and Mahindra & Mahindra.

His death came after a prolonged illness. He suffered from Alzheimer's disease.
