= Jack Martin (cricketer) =

English cricketer

Personal information
- Full name: John William Martin
- Born: 16 February 1917; Catford, London
- Died: 4 January 1987 (aged 69); Woolwich, London
- Batting: Right-handed
- Bowling: Right-arm fast

International information
- National side: England (1947)
- Only Test (cap 319): 7 June 1947 v South Africa

Domestic team information
- Years: Team
- 1939–1953: Kent

Career statistics
Competition	Tests	First-class
Matches	1	44
Runs scored	26	623
Batting average	13.00	11.53
100s/50s	0/0	0/0
Top score	26	40
Balls bowled	270	9,608
Wickets	1	162
Bowling average	111.00	24.00
5 wickets in innings	0	8
10 wickets in match	0	1
Best bowling	1/111	7/53
Catches/stumpings	0/–	32/–
- Source: CricInfo, 17 December 2018

John William Martin (16 February 1917 – 4 January 1987) was an English amateur cricketer who played in one Test match for the England cricket team in 1947. In a career which spanned 15 years before and after World War II, Martin played in only 44 first-class cricket matches, mainly for Kent County Cricket Club.

Martin was born in Catford in London. Most of his time was taken up with business work, and most of his cricket was played at club level for Catford Wanderers. When Martin was available for Kent his height and pace almost always made him valuable for a team mainly reliant on Fred Ridgway for pace bowling. Martin won his county cap in 1946 and in 1947, as a result of taking 4/55 for Marylebone Cricket Club (MCC) against the touring South Africans and 9/98 for Kent against Hampshire, was selected for the First Test against South Africa at Trent Bridge.

Although by no means genuinely fast, Martin had sufficient speed to offer contrast to an English attack dominated by spin and medium paced seam bowlers.

During World War II Martin served as a battery commander in the Royal Artillery. Martin died at Woolwich in London in January 1987 at the age of 69.

== See also ==
- One Test Wonder

== Bibliography ==
- Carlaw, Derek (2020). Kent County Cricketers, A to Z: Part Two (1919–1939) (PDF). Cardiff: ACS.
