= Allan Watkins =

Welsh cricketer (1922–2011)

Personal information
- Full name: Albert John Watkins
- Born: 21 April 1922; Usk, Monmouthshire, Wales
- Died: 3 August 2011 (aged 89); Kidderminster, Worcestershire, England
- Batting: Left-handed
- Bowling: Left-arm medium-fast

International information
- National side: England

Career statistics
Competition	Tests	First-class
Matches	15	484
Runs scored	810	20,361
Batting average	40.50	30.57
100s/50s	2/4	32/108
Top score	137*	170*
Balls bowled	1,364	51,469
Wickets	11	833
Bowling average	50.36	24.48
5 wickets in innings	0	25
10 wickets in match	0	0
Best bowling	3/20	7/28
Catches/stumpings	17/–	464/–
- Source: Cricinfo

Albert John "Allan" Watkins (21 April 1922 – 3 August 2011) was a Welsh cricketer, who played for England in fifteen Tests from 1948 to 1952.

== Life and career ==
Born in Usk, Monmouthshire, Allan Watkins made his debut for Glamorgan just three weeks after his seventeenth birthday in 1939, as World War II loomed. He served in the war as a firefighter in the Royal Navy.

He was a left-handed all-rounder: a capable batsman, a medium to fast-medium bowler and a brilliant close fielder, particularly at short leg. He was the first Glamorgan cricketer to score a century in Tests for England, and played for the county until 1961, when he was 39 years old and struggling with asthma.

Watkins toured South Africa in 1948-49 and India and Pakistan in 1951-52 with the English Test team, and also participated in the 1955-56 'A' Tour to Pakistan. In 1953–54, he played with the Commonwealth XI in India, returning home early through injury.

He was voted Indian Cricket Cricketer of the Year after a successful Test series there in 1951–52. During that series Watkins battled his way to a nine-hour-long, unbeaten 137, in Delhi, his best Test score. Watkins' best Test performances were overseas, as his five home Tests did not provide a single innings above fifty. His other Test century came in the Fourth Test at Johannesburg in 1948–49, when he made 111.

Watkins scored 1000 runs in an English season 13 times, and also took 100 wickets in 1954 and 1955, thus achieving the double in those two seasons.

He also played football for Cardiff City and Plymouth Argyle, and Rugby union for Pontypool. He played Minor Counties cricket for Suffolk in 1965 and 1966.

Watkins went on to successfully coach school cricket, most notably at Oundle School and Framlingham College. He died in Kidderminster, Worcestershire, on 3 August 2011, following a short illness.
