= Nigel Howard =

English cricketer (1925–1979)

Personal information
- Full name: Nigel David Howard
- Born: 18 May 1925; Gee Cross, Hyde, Cheshire, England
- Died: 31 May 1979 (aged 54); Douglas, Isle of Man
- Batting: Right-handed
- Role: Batsman

International information
- National side: England
- Test debut (cap 363): 2 November 1951 v India
- Last Test: 14 January 1952 v India

Domestic team information
- Years: Team
- 1946–1953: Lancashire
- 1949–1954: Marylebone Cricket Club (MCC)

Career statistics
Competition	Tests	FC
Matches	4	198
Runs scored	86	6,152
Batting average	17.20	24.70
100s/50s	–/–	3/36
Top score	23	145
Balls bowled	–	90
Wickets	–	1
Bowling average	–	52.00
5 wickets in innings	–	–
10 wickets in match	–	–
Best bowling	–	1/14
Catches/stumpings	4/–	153/–
- Source: CricketArchive, 21 December 2008

Nigel David Howard (18 May 1925 – 31 May 1979) was an English cricketer, who played for Lancashire and England. Born in Gee Cross, Hyde, Cheshire, he captained England on the tour to India in 1951–52. In the only four Test matches he played in, England won one and drew three, although the series was tied after the Fifth Test was lost (Howard was ill and Donald Carr captained England in his absence). Howard was chosen to lead the side to the sub-continent largely because he was the best available amateur (Len Hutton became the first professional England captain of the 20th century a few months later) and a successful leader of Lancashire (1949–53).

== Youth and early career ==
Howard's younger brother Barry, also played for Lancashire, and their father Rupert was secretary of Lancashire County Cricket Club for several years. Howard went to Rossall School and played for Rossall Cricket Club. He showed early promise, leading his club's averages for the 1941 and 1942 seasons while still in his teens. As well as performing well at cricket, Howard was also a capable golfer and hockey player, representing Cheshire in both sports.

He made his debut for Lancashire on 25 May 1946. Playing against Middlesex, Howard batted at number four and made scores of 4 and 3 as Lancashire won by seven wickets. It was the only first-class match he played in the year. In the 1946 and 1947 seasons, he scored 131 runs in 7 matches at an average of 14.56. He established himself as a regular player in the 1948 season, in which he scored 944 runs in 23 matches at an average of 36.30. This included his only century of the year; he made 145 against Derbyshire, the highest score of his career, and was awarded his county cap in 1948.

== Captaincy ==
Howard was officially given the Lancashire captaincy in 1949 at the age of 23, becoming the youngest player to captain Lancashire. He guided the team to a share of the County Championship title in 1950; Lancashire did not win again until 2011. He remained Lancashire's captain until he retired from first-class cricket at the end of 1953.

He led the Marylebone Cricket Club (MCC) most capably on, and equally importantly in view of the considerable diplomatic demands of those times, off the field, during the tour to India in 1951-52. He soldiered on but developed pleurisy during the second half of the tour, which forced him to return home and miss the last Test match. At county level he was a stylish batsman and excellent fielder.

== Post-cricket ==
After his cricketing career ended, Howard entered the family textile business. In late 1954 he married Ann Phillips, an English amateur golfer. He retired in 1976 and moved to the Isle of Man where he died on 31 May 1979, aged 54.

Sporting positions
Preceded by Freddie Brown	English national cricket captain 1951/52	Succeeded by Len Hutton
