= Cyril Poole =

English sportsman (1921–1996)

Personal information
- Full name: Cyril John Poole
- Born: 13 March 1921; Mansfield, Nottinghamshire, England
- Died: 11 February 1996 (aged 74); Balderton, Nottinghamshire, England
- Batting: Left-handed
- Bowling: Left arm medium
- Role: Occasional wicket-keeper

International information
- National side: England
- Test debut (cap 368): 30 December 1951 v India
- Last Test: 10 February 1952 v India

Domestic team information
- Years: Team
- 1948–1962: Nottinghamshire

Career statistics
Competition	Test	First-class
Matches	3	383
Runs scored	161	19,364
Batting average	40.25	32.54
100s/50s	–/2	24/127
Top score	69 not out	222 not out
Balls bowled	30	550
Wickets	–	4
Bowling average	–	86.75
5 wickets in innings	–	–
10 wickets in match	–	–
Best bowling	–	1/8
Catches/stumpings	1/–	224/5
- Source: Cricinfo, 25 May 2009

Cyril John Poole (13 March 1921 – 11 February 1996) was an English cricketer, who played for Nottinghamshire and in three Tests for England. He also played football for Mansfield Town, Gillingham and Wolverhampton Wanderers.

== Life and career ==
Poole was born in Mansfield, Nottinghamshire.

An entertaining left-handed batsman, Poole was 27 before he came into county cricket, but soon established himself in what was, throughout his time with them, one of the weaker first-class county sides. His best season was 1961, when he scored 1,860 runs in first-class cricket.

His one taste of Test cricket came on the 1951/52 tour to India. Poole, who had replaced Jack Ikin because of injury, played three times for what was, in effect, an England second eleven, scoring two fifties. He was never picked for England again, his batting defensive frailties counting against him, though he continued in county cricket until 1962, and had his best season at the age of 40. He was an outstanding fielder in almost any position.

His healthy Test batting average of 40.25, was complemented by one of 32.45 at first-class level. Poole was an occasional bowler and wicket-keeper.

As a footballer, he became Mansfield Town's youngest-ever debutant, aged 15. He later played for Gillingham and Wolves. He played as a left-back or left winger.

Cyril Poole died, in Balderton, Nottinghamshire, on 11 February 1996, aged 74. His Wisden obituary in 1997, which described him as a "splendidly entertaining" cricketer, "one of the most gifted and audacious left-handed batsmen on the circuit... and a great fielder". It also included an anecdote:

"He would regularly borrow any bat that was lying around the dressing room, never worrying about the weight or other technicalities. It is said that his team-mates tried to cure him with a trick bat, which was merely a shell filled with sawdust. He scored about 70 with it and apparently never noticed."
