= C. D. Gopinath =

Indian cricketer (1930–2026)

Personal information
- Full name: Chingleput Doraikannu Gopinath
- Born: 1 March 1930; Madras, Madras Presidency, British India (now Chennai, Tamil Nadu, India)
- Died: 9 April 2026 (aged 96); Chennai, India
- Batting: Right-handed
- Bowling: Right-arm medium pace

International information
- National side: India
- Test debut (cap 55): 14 December 1951 v England
- Last Test: 23 January 1960 v Australia

Domestic team information
- Years: Team
- 1949–50 to 1962–63: Madras

Career statistics
Competition	Tests	First-class
Matches	8	83
Runs scored	242	4,259
Batting average	22.00	42.16
100s/50s	0/1	9/23
Top score	50*	234
Balls bowled	48	714
Wickets	1	14
Bowling average	11.00	27.78
5 wickets in innings	0	0
10 wickets in match	0	0
Best bowling	1/11	3/15
Catches/stumpings	2/–	49/–
- Source: ESPNcricinfo, 30 March 2019

Chingleput Doraikannu Gopinath (1 March 1930 – 9 April 2026) was an Indian Test cricketer. He was a right-handed batsman who was also a captain for Madras and South Zone.

== Early life ==
Gopinath was born in Madras, Madras Presidency, British India on 1 March 1930. He graduated from Madras Christian College. Gopinath also obtained an M.A. degree in 1952.

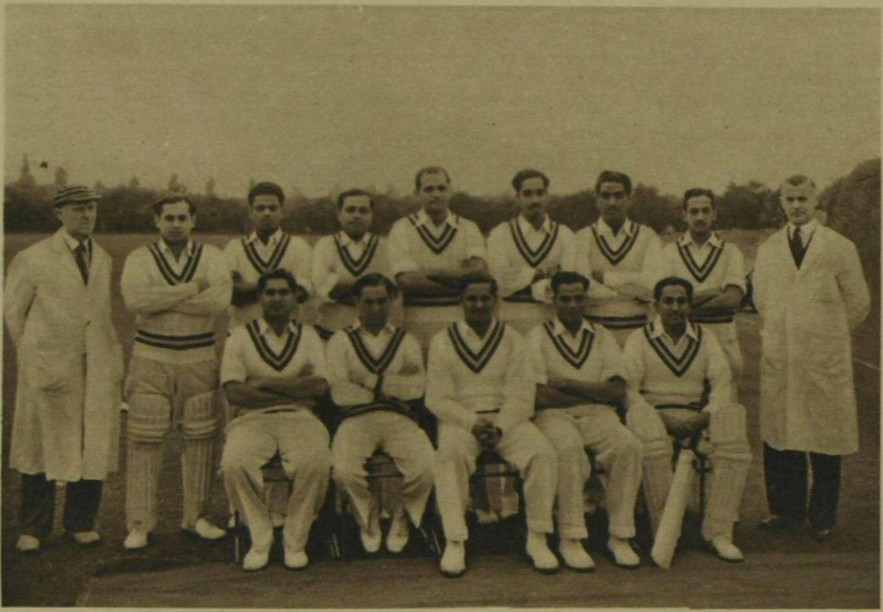
The 1952 Indian touring cricket team in the United Kingdom. Gopinath is the third player from the right in the back row.

== Cricketing career ==
Gopinath was a right-handed batsman. He scored 50* and 42 on his Test debut against the England cricket team in 1951–52, batting at No.8 in both innings. He contributed a quick 35 in the final Test of that series when India recorded its first Test victory. He toured England in 1952 and completely failed with the bat.

At home he played Tests against Pakistan in 1952–53 and Australia in 1959–60, and toured Pakistan in 1954–55. He was chosen in the team to the West Indies in 1952–53 but turned down the invitation.

He captained Madras from 1955–56 to 1962–63, as well as South Zone in the Duleep Trophy. In the 1970s, he served as a national selector under Vijay Merchant and later as the chairman, and managed the 1979 tour to England. He averaged more than 50 in the Ranji Trophy with a highest score of 234.

== Personal life and death ==
Gopinath and his wife, Comala, a former champion golfer, lived in Coonoor in the Nilgiris District of Tamil Nadu. Gopinath died at his home in Chennai, on 9 April 2026, at the age of 96.
