= John Kay (cricket journalist) =

English sportswriter (1910–1999)

John Kay

John Kay (12 January 1910 – 16 February 1999) was a British journalist and cricketer who was a cricket correspondent for the Manchester Evening News from the end of the Second World War to 1975 and for the Brighton Argus. He toured Australia for the 1950-51 Ashes series for the Manchester Evening News and wrote several cricketing books, including Ashes to Hassett (1951) and Cricket in the Leagues (1970).

== Cricket career ==
Kay played for Middleton in the Central Lancashire League. When Basil d'Oliveira emigrated from South Africa in 1960 because Apartheid banned him from playing first-class cricket, Kay arranged for him to play for Middleton as a professional. He wrote that d'Oliveira was surprised to see white people serving him in restaurants and doing menial work. D'Oliveira later played for Worcestershire (from 1964) and England (from 1966).
