= Michael Green (British Army officer) =

English sportsman and cricket administrator

Michael Arthur Green (3 October 1891 at Bristol – 28 December 1971 (aged 80) at Kensington, London), was an all-round sportsman primarily known as a first-class cricketer for Gloucestershire and Essex, and as a cricket administrator who managed England tours to South Africa and Australia and who was secretary of Worcestershire. He also played soccer and rugby union to county standard.

Green was a career army officer who reached the rank of Brigadier and served in both the First World War and the Second World War. He represented the British Army at cricket, soccer, rugby and squash.
