= Eddie Leadbeater =

English cricketer

Personal information
- Full name: Edric Leadbeater
- Born: 15 August 1927; Lockwood, Huddersfield, West Riding of Yorkshire, England
- Died: 17 April 2011 (aged 83); Huddersfield, West Yorkshire, England
- Batting: Right-handed
- Bowling: Legbreak googly

International information
- National side: England
- Test debut: 14 December 1951 v India
- Last Test: 30 December 1951 v India

Career statistics
Competition	Test	First-class
Matches	2	118
Runs scored	40	1,548
Batting average	20.00	15.17
100s/50s	0/0	1/3
Top score	38	116
Balls bowled	289	16,561
Wickets	2	289
Bowling average	109.00	27.49
5 wickets in innings	0	11
10 wickets in match	0	2
Best bowling	1/38	8/83
Catches/stumpings	3/–	75/–
- Source: CricInfo, 7 November 2022

Edric "Eddie" Leadbeater (15 August 1927 – 17 April 2011) was an English cricketer who played in two Tests in 1951. He was born in Lockwood, Huddersfield, West Riding of Yorkshire, and died in Huddersfield.

Leadbeater was a right-handed lower order batsman, and a leg-break and googly bowler, who had a couple of good seasons for Yorkshire in 1950 and 1951, but failed to keep his place in the side. He reappeared for Warwickshire County Cricket Club in 1957 and 1958, as a possible replacement for Eric Hollies, who retired after the 1957 season; but he failed to take enough wickets and his contract was not renewed.

Leadbeater's leg-spin was always inclined to be expensive: in his two good seasons for Yorkshire, his wickets cost an average of around 25 runs apiece. His selection to replace Derbyshire's injured Bert Rhodes on the 1951-52 Marylebone Cricket Club (MCC) tour of India, Pakistan and Ceylon was unexpected, and though he played in two Test matches, he was not a success. Cricket writer, Colin Bateman, noted "Leadbeater was more of an accurate roller, than a traditional leg spinner and his bowling posed few terrors for the Indian batsmen". Wisden Cricketer's Almanack reported that he modified his action to avoid being too expensive on the tour: however, he was never the same bowler again, and the rest of his first-class career produced fewer than 100 wickets.

Dropping out of the Yorkshire side, he joined Warwickshire for 1957 and played fairly regularly in 1958 after Hollies retired. Though he took just 49 wickets (and only 25 of them in Championship matches), he scored his only first-class century in what proved to be his last season: going in as a nightwatchman, he made 116 and shared in a second-wicket stand of 209 with Fred Gardner in the match against Glamorgan at Coventry.

Leadbeater is a rarity as an England Test cricketer, in that he was never awarded a county cap.

After leaving first-class cricket, Leadbeater played regularly for Almondbury Cricket Club in the Huddersfield Cricket League, taking over 1,000 wickets before he retired at the age of 68.
