= English cricket team in Australia in 1950–51 =

International cricket tour

The England cricket team toured Australia in the 1950–51 season to play a five-match Test series against Australia for The Ashes. The tour was organised by Marylebone Cricket Club (MCC). The team was called England in its international matches, and MCC in others.

Australia won the Test series 4–1, and therefore retained The Ashes.

== Test series summary ==
- 1st Test at Brisbane Cricket Ground – Australia won by 70 runs
- 2nd Test at Melbourne Cricket Ground – Australia won by 28 runs
- 3rd Test at Sydney Cricket Ground – Australia won by an innings and 13 runs
- 4th Test at Adelaide Oval – Australia won by 274 runs
- 5th Test at Sydney Cricket Ground – England won by 8 wickets

== Bibliography ==
- Harte, Chris (1993). A History of Australian Cricket. London: André Deutsch. ISBN 978-02-33988-25-2.
- Preston, Norman, ed. (1952). Wisden Cricketers' Almanack (89th ed.). London: Sporting Handbooks Ltd. OCLC 867849211.
- Robinson, Ray (1975). On Top Down Under. Australia: Cassell. ISBN 978-07-26973-64-2.
- West, Peter, ed. (1951). Playfair Cricket Annual (4th ed.). London: Playfair Books Ltd. OCLC 906559129.
