= History of English cricket (1919–1945) =

Cricket history (1919–1945)

English cricket was completely disrupted by World War I, and there were no first-class matches after August 1914 until May 1919. A similar situation arose in World War II with a shutdown of first-class cricket from September 1939 until the summer of 1945 when eleven matches were specially arranged; cricket returned to normal in 1946 with a full domestic programme and a Test series against India.

In the 21 seasons between the wars, England took part in 120 Test matches as part of fifteen home and thirteen away series. (Note: England should have played in 121 Tests. The third Test of the 1938 series against Australia, due to commence on Thursday, 8 July at Old Trafford, was abandoned without a ball being bowled on account of persistent heavy rain.) Several other first-class tours were organised by Marylebone Cricket Club (MCC), and by private individuals like Sir Julien Cahn and Lionel Tennyson. Having won The Ashes in 1926 and successfully defended them in 1928–29, England thereafter had to contend with Don Bradman, whose consistently high scoring was a key difference between England and Australia through the 1930s. Under the captaincy of Douglas Jardine in 1932–33, England controversially deployed so-called "leg theory", better known as "bodyline", in order to regain The Ashes, but almost caused an international incident in doing so.

Domestically, the only major tournament was the County Championship which in this period was mostly dominated by Yorkshire and Lancashire. Between them, they won seventeen of the 21 titles at stake, and the "Roses Match" became the most significant domestic fixture of the English season. Nottinghamshire and Derbyshire won one title each, and so Middlesex, with two, were the only southern champions of the inter-war period. Other domestic fixtures of note were the Champion County match (annual to 1935), Gentlemen v Players (annual), North v South (ten matches in nine seasons) and the University Match (annual).

Leading English players of the inter-war years included Wilfred Rhodes, Jack Hobbs, Frank Woolley, Bert Strudwick, Patsy Hendren, Tich Freeman, Maurice Tate, Herbert Sutcliffe, George Duckworth, Harold Larwood, Wally Hammond, Maurice Leyland, Les Ames, Hedley Verity, Len Hutton, and Denis Compton.

== Post-war recovery (1919–1920) ==
=== Two-day matches ===
Marylebone Cricket Club (MCC) remained the controlling body in English cricket throughout the inter-war period. After the end of World War I in November 1918, MCC and some of the first-class county clubs were determined to arrange a full County Championship programme for the 1919 season. Despite calls for radical innovation, they intended to change things "as little as possible", and the only change of note that they did introduce was the two-day match, instead of three-day.

The authorities faced heavy criticism for their rash decision to introduce the two-day format, especially from Wisden editor Sydney Pardon, who argued against holding the 1919 County Championship at all. Pardon pointed out that the county clubs faced many problems in dealing with post-war recovery, not least the question of who would be able to play for their teams, as the war had taken a heavy toll of first-class cricketers. Much depended on the availability of pre-war players who could resume their careers, and on finding new talent.

=== 1919 County Championship ===
The two-day format was "a complete failure". The weather was sunny in 1919, and that ensured good batting conditions. As a result, the majority of matches could not be completed in two days, and were drawn, as predicted by Pardon. Another factor was that the County Championship title had to be decided on a percentage basis, and that, also foreseen by Pardon, almost created a travesty. The sixteen clubs had to arrange their own fixtures at short notice, and Worcestershire decided not to compete. Northamptonshire and Somerset were able to arrange only twelve matches apiece, whereas Yorkshire played 26, and Lancashire 24.

Yorkshire won twelve of their matches for a percentage of 46.15%. They and Derbyshire were the only teams who managed more wins than draws. The disparity in matches played almost resulted in a false picture because Kent, who played only fourteen matches, had a percentage of 42.85%, and would have won the title if they could have taken one more wicket in their final match (which was drawn). Roy Webber commented that Yorkshire's title in such circumstances was "just".

Three-day matches were reinstated ahead of the 1920 County Championship.

=== Australian Imperial Forces tour ===
An Australian Imperial Force Touring XI was formed ahead of the 1919 season from soldiers of the AIF who were still in Britain. The team toured the country between May and September, playing a total of 33 matches, of which 28 were first-class. They had a good record in their first-class fixtures—twelve wins, four defeats, and twelve draws. As with the county teams, their two-day matches resulted in a high number of draws.

The team included one major, four captains, a lieutenant, a warrant officer, and also three sergeants. Even so, they elected Herbie Collins, whose rank was lance corporal, as their team captain. Chris Harte wrote that the team "ignored all considerations of (military) rank", Collins "giving orders to seven commissioned officers without anyone questioning his authority". This would have been unthinkable in England, where the senior officer in a similar military team would automatically have assumed the team captaincy.

The strength of the AIF is illustrated by the fact that six of its players went on to represent Australia in Test cricket: Collins, Jack Gregory, Nip Pellew, Bertie Oldfield, Johnny Taylor, and Hammy Love.

=== 1920 County Championship ===
Recovery continued in 1920, and Worcestershire returned to the Championship. The counties played three-day matches, and there was a noticeable reduction in the number of draws. However, the number of matches played by each team was still at variance, ranging from 30 played by Sussex to 18 by Derbyshire and Worcestershire.

The title was again decided by percentage of matches won. Middlesex, leading the table just ahead of Lancashire, needed to beat Surrey at Lord's in their final match. They won by 55 runs with just ten minutes left, and took the title with a percentage of 77.00%. Lancashire had 74.61%. Middlesex played 20 matches with 15 wins; Lancashire played 28 and won 19.

== "Preserving the natural order" ==
In the aftermath of the First World War, more especially of the Russian Revolution, there were concerns at MCC and in the cricketing establishment generally about how times were changing. The three most prominent establishment figures were Lord Harris, Lord Hawke, and Pelham Warner who were determined that cricket in the 1920s should continue as before the war under the leadership of amateurs like themselves. As Derek Birley put it, they were intent on "preserving the natural order of things".

When the Lancashire professional Cec Parkin had the "temerity" to criticise the England captain Arthur Gilligan, Warner denounced him as "the first cricketing Bolshevik". It backfired on Warner. Even among his own amateur brethren there were many who asserted that Gilligan, a known fascist, was a waste of space whose selection over Surrey captain Percy Fender had been done because of "petty jealousies between MCC and Surrey".

Accusations flew back and forth. In the 1924–25 annual edition of The Cricketer (Warner's own magazine), Hawke, supported by Harris, stated that there was no such thing as class prejudice in cricket. Conversely, in his view, the problem was a shortage of amateurs, especially in the northern counties, and this had "led to a lack of enterprise" (Hawke give no rationale for that supposed outcome). During the same winter, while speaking at Yorkshire's annual dinner, Hawke responded to a published suggestion by Parkin—that Jack Hobbs should captain England—with his oft-misquoted plea:

Pray God that no professional may ever captain England!

Warner attempted to explain this away by saying that Hawke meant it would be "a bad day when no amateur was fit to play for England" and, that, in any case, an amateur was "better qualified" to shoulder the captain's "off-field responsibilities".

What Warner failed to understand was that it was not so much what Hawke said that mattered, but what Hawke was seen to represent. As Hawke's biographer James Coldham put it, Hawke was holding onto "the dead hand of the past". Warner again attacked Parkin, with the result that Lancashire, whose committee was pro-establishment, sacked Parkin in 1926.

== International cricket ==
Another of MCC's responsibilities was selection and management of the England team. Australia were England's main rivals, and The Ashes were contested in ten series between 1921 and 1938, five in England and five in Australia, infamously so in the "Bodyline" series of 1932–33. England played three home series against South Africa, and four in South Africa, including their last overseas tour before the Second World War.

In 1919, the International Cricket Conference had only its three original full members (Australia, England, and South Africa). The membership and, hence, the number of countries able to play Test cricket doubled on 31 May 1926 with the promotions of India, New Zealand, and the West Indies to full member status. England played each of these teams for the first time in the next few seasons. To 1939, there were three England v India series, two in England and one in India; four England v New Zealand series, two in each country; and five England v West Indies series, three of them in England, including 1939.

=== England v Australia ===
England were outclassed by Australia in the first two series after the war but, by the middle of the 1920s, they had a team good enough to win and retain the Ashes. Don Bradman dominated the 1930 series and Douglas Jardine used the leg theory stratagem in 1932–33 to try to curb Bradman's massive run-scoring. It worked and England recovered the Ashes, but at enormous cost of cricketing prestige. With leg theory in disgrace, normal cricket resumed in 1934. Australia won back the Ashes and kept them until 1953, though England made a real fight of it in each of the 1934, 1936–37 and 1938 series.

=== England v South Africa ===
England and South Africa were quite well matched throughout this period, and both teams enjoyed series wins at home and away. The last match between them before the war was the notorious "Timeless Test" at Kingsmead in March 1939. Despite the intention to play to a finish, it was agreed after nine days on the field to call it a draw, so that the England team could catch their boat home.

=== England v India ===
England played India for the first time in 1932 when a single Test was staged. England won that match, and then won 2–0 in each of two three-match series (home and away) over the next four years.

=== England v New Zealand ===
England's first Test series against New Zealand was in 1929–30. There were three more before the war and, though England won all four series, the majority of matches were drawn, and New Zealand did not win any.

=== England v West Indies ===
England's first Test against West Indies was in 1928. Five series were played before the war including the one in 1939 which had just finished when the international crisis arose. England were mostly successful against West Indies, but not in 1934–35 when the home team recorded a 2–1 series victory.

== The County Championship ==
The inter-war period in the County Championship was dominated by the northern clubs. Yorkshire had won the two-day version in 1919 but then there was brief southern success with back-to-back victories by Middlesex in 1920 and 1921. In 1922, Yorkshire won the first of four successive titles to 1925. It was during the 1920s that the "Roses Match" was the most significant domestic fixture and Lancashire won four of the next five championships, their run interrupted by Nottinghamshire in 1929. Starting in 1931, Yorkshire won seven out of nine competitions to 1939, the other two titles going to Lancashire in 1934 and to the fourth northern club Derbyshire in 1936.

There was only one addition to the County Championship between the wars, Glamorgan becoming the 17th county in 1921. Worcestershire did not compete in 1919 but rejoined for the 1920 season.

=== Derbyshire ===
In 1919, Derbyshire welcomed back Billy Bestwick, Samuel Cadman, Arthur Morton, Joseph Bowden, Archibald Slater and James Horsley. Their best new player in 1919 was Guy Jackson. The team struggled that season and were placed tenth, winning three and losing nine of their fourteen matches.

Derbyshire had a disastrous season in 1920, losing seventeen of their eighteen matches, and struggled for most of the 1920s with another winless season in 1924. Gradually, they assembled a strong team and, by 1927, they had a decent side which finished fifth and commanded respect. Harry Elliott, Jim Hutchinson and Harry Storer junior all made their debuts in 1920 and, over the next five years, the team welcomed Leslie Townsend, Stan Worthington and Garnet Lee. Denis Smith, who has one of the longest first-class careers on record, first appeared in 1927. Albert Alderman began in 1928 and then the team really took shape as Derbyshire discovered Tommy Mitchell, Alf Pope, Bill Copson, Charlie Elliott and George Pope. From 1928 to 1933, the team was always in mid-table.

The team finally realised its potential and finished third behind Lancashire in 1934 and second behind Yorkshire in 1935. The 1936 championship-winning team was captained by A. W. Richardson and its key players were the main bowlers Copson, Mitchell, Alf Pope and all-rounder Townsend. Wicket-keeper Harry Elliott, very effective in combination with Mitchell, accounted for 62 batsmen. Four batsmen scored over 1,000 championship runs: Townsend, Worthington, Smith and Alderman. Derbyshire finished third in 1937, when Dusty Rhodes made his debut, and a creditable fifth in 1938 but then dropped back to mid-table in 1939. The promising pace bowler Cliff Gladwin made his debut in 1939 and played four times that season. Gladwin went on to play for England in the 1940s and form a formidable partnership for Derbyshire with Les Jackson.

=== Essex ===
Essex could win only two of their eighteen two-day matches in the 1919 championship, twelve others ending in draws. They were placed fourteenth in the final, percentage-based table. There was a much improved performance in 1920 when, with nine wins and nine defeats, the team moved into mid-table. Essex generally struggled through the 1920s and were never more than a mid-table team. They were close to the wooden spoon in 1928 when only the winless Worcestershire had a worse record. In 1930, Ken Farnes made his debut and Essex climbed to sixth place. Two losing seasons followed and then the team reached fourth in 1933 before slipping back into mid-table for the next three years. For the last three seasons before the Second World War, Essex were one of the country's better teams and finished sixth, sixth and fourth successively.

Returning Essex players in 1919 included Percy Perrin, Johnny Douglas, Frank Gillingham, John Freeman, Jack Russell, George Louden and Joseph Dixon. Their best new player was Whiz Morris. Laurie Eastman made his debut in 1920. New players from 1921 to 1928 included Claude Ashton, Jack O'Connor, Joe Hipkin, Jim Cutmore, Stan Nichols, Arthur Daer, Leonard Crawley, Charles Bray, Dudley Pope and Denys Wilcox. In 1929, the tide began to turn as Essex became more competitive and, more importantly, were able to introduce four players with great potential in Tom Pearce, Roy Sheffield, Peter Smith and Tom Wade. In the early 1930s, new players included Reginald Taylor, Victor Evans, Hopper Read, Ray Smith, John Stephenson and Sonny Avery.

=== Glamorgan ===
Glamorgan joined the County Championship in 1921 and remain the only non-English member. First-class cricket gave Glamorgan a tough baptism and they finished bottom in their first championship season, winning only two of their eighteen matches. They were in the penultimate position in both 1922 and 1923. In their first three seasons, they won five matches but doubled that total in 1924 and moved up the table to thirteenth. They were bottom again in 1925 and were usually one of the bottom three teams from then to 1939. Their best seasons were 1926 and 1937 when they were eighth and seventh respectively.

The 1921 team included Trevor Arnott, William Bates, Johnnie Clay, Harry Creber, Stamford Hacker, Jack Nash and Norman Riches. Among the players they introduced through these first nineteen seasons were Jack Mercer, Dai Davies, Cyril Walters, Emrys Davies, Maurice Turnbull, Arnold Dyson, George Lavis, Haydn Davies, Phil Clift, Willie Jones, Wilf Wooller and Allan Watkins.

=== Gloucestershire ===
Gloucestershire were generally competitive through the period and there was one season in particular, 1930, when they were very close to winning the championship under the captaincy of the charismatic Bev Lyon. They won fifteen of their 28 matches, five more than champions Lancashire, but finished second because they gained first innings lead points twice against Lancashire's eight, which left them with a three-point deficit in the final table. They were runners-up again in 1931, behind Yorkshire, but this time the gap was considerable.

Gloucestershire's greatest player of the inter-war years was the England batsman Wally Hammond and they had three outstanding bowlers in Charlie Parker, Tom Goddard and Reg Sinfield. Other accomplished players were batsmen Charlie Barnett and Alf Dipper; and wicket-keeper Harry Smith.

=== Hampshire ===
Hampshire were never in title contention between the wars. They were a perennial mid-table team through the 1920s but had a weaker side in the 1930s when they always finished in the bottom half.

Their best player was the run-scorer Phil Mead and other good batsmen were George Brown and Johnny Arnold. The best bowlers were Alec Kennedy, Jack Newman and Lofty Herman. Behind the stumps, Hampshire were well served by Walter Livsey, Neil McCorkell and, when required, by Brown too.

=== Kent ===
In the decade before the First World War, Kent had one of the best teams in the country. They were narrowly beaten on percentage by Yorkshire for the 1919 Championship but, given that they played only 14 games and Yorkshire played 26, Roy Webber declared Yorkshire's title to be "just". That was the closest Kent got to winning an inter-war title but they were always a top half team until 1935 when they slipped to tenth. Their lowest position was twelfth in 1937 but they were back up to fifth in 1939. Kent were one of the most consistent teams of the period but never quite good enough to challenge the northern counties.

Their outstanding players between the wars were all-rounder Frank Woolley, wicket-keeper/batsman Les Ames and leg break bowler Tich Freeman.

=== Lancashire ===
Lancashire enjoyed the most successful period of their history in the late 1920s. They won the championship five times in nine seasons between 1926 and 1934. They forged a famous rivalry with neighbours Yorkshire which elevated the "Roses Match" to the status of England's greatest domestic fixture. In the whole inter-war period, there were only two seasons (1936 and 1937) in which Lancashire finished outside the top six.

Although the county had numerous quality players, the essential factors in their success were professionalism and teamwork. Among their best players were England wicket-keeper George Duckworth; batsmen Ernest Tyldesley, Charlie Hallows, Harry Makepeace and Eddie Paynter; and bowlers Ted McDonald, Cec Parkin and Dick Tyldesley.

=== Leicestershire ===
Leicestershire struggled financially through the inter-war years and their team, never in contention, was invariably in the lower half of the table. They took the wooden spoon in 1933 and 1939. One consequence of their perennially straitened circumstances—both in terms of money and the ability to attract new players—was that they became the first county club in the 20th century to appoint a professional as their captain. This was in 1935, and Ewart Astill led them to sixth place in the County Championship with 11 victories. Wisden hailed it as "the most successful season in the history of the club". But the team reverted to type over the following seasons under the captaincy of the New Zealand "amateur" Stewie Dempster, who was contracted to Sir Julien Cahn.

Among their better players were the wicket-keepers Tom Sidwell and Percy Corrall; batsmen Norman Armstrong, Les Berry, and Eddie Dawson; and bowlers Ewart Astill, George Geary, and Haydon Smith.

=== Middlesex ===
After a disappointing 1919 campaign, Middlesex improved dramatically to win back-to-back titles in 1920 and 1921. The team had its ups and downs for the next decade or so but became a strong unit again in 1935 when they finished third. They finished the thirties with four successive runners-up seasons from 1936 to 1939.

Middlesex's captain in the twenties was Frank Mann who also led England on their 1922–23 tour of South Africa. The most outstanding players in the two title-winning seasons were England batsman Patsy Hendren and all-rounder J. W. Hearne. Others in that team were wicket-keeper Joe Murrell; fast bowler Jack Durston; and all-rounders Nigel Haig, Harry Lee and Greville Stevens. Walter Robins was the team captain in the thirties and both Jim Smith and Jim Sims were England bowlers at the time. In the last few seasons before the Second World War, Middlesex could call upon Denis Compton, Bill Edrich and Jack Robertson.

=== Northamptonshire ===
Northamptonshire struggled significantly during this period, frequently finishing in the bottom six of the county standings and placing last on multiple occasions. Fred Bakewell, Vallance Jupp, Benjamin Bellamy and Nobby Clark were the leading players for the team during these difficult seasons.

=== Nottinghamshire ===
Nottinghamshire (Notts) had the formidable pace attack of Harold Larwood and Bill Voce for several seasons. Until they fell away somewhat in the late thirties, Notts were one of the most competitive teams and usually in contention. They won the title in 1929 and were runners-up in three other seasons. Noted batsmen were George Gunn, "Dodge" Whysall, Arthur Carr, Joe Hardstaff Jr, Charles Harris, Walter Keeton, Wilfred Payton and Willis Walker. Besides Larwood and Voce, Notts had good bowlers in Fred Barratt, Tom Richmond and Sam Staples. Ben Lilley succeeded Thomas Oates as wicket-keeper in 1924 and held the post until he retired in 1937 and was succeeded by Arthur Wheat.

=== Somerset ===
Somerset were never competitive and were always somewhere between mid-table and bottom six. Noted batsmen were Harold Gimblett, Frank Lee and Jack MacBryan. Their best bowlers were Jack White, who played in fifteen Tests for England, Bill Andrews and Arthur Wellard. Wally Luckes was the team's wicket-keeper through most of the inter-war years.

=== Surrey ===
Surrey had a strong team in the 1920s but then fell away, after Jack Hobbs retired, to be a mid-table one through most of the 1930s. Besides Hobbs (known as "The Master"), noted batsmen were Andy Ducat, Andy Sandham, Tom Barling, Errol Holmes, Laurie Fishlock, Bob Gregory, Tom Shepherd and Stan Squires. Surrey's best bowlers were Bill Hitch, Alf Gover and Percy Fender. They could also call upon Maurice Allom, Alan Peach, Tom Rushby and Eddie Watts. Behind the stumps, Surrey were well served by Bert Strudwick and Ted Brooks.

=== Sussex ===
Having been a mid-table team through most of the 1920s, Sussex showed a marked improvement in 1928 to finish a good sixth and then a strong fifth in 1929. They slipped a little in 1930 but then came good and were fourth, second, second and second from 1931 to 1934. They were very close to their first official title in both the latter two seasons when one more win might have swung the balance. Sussex fell away in 1935 and were in mid-table from then to 1939. Noted batsmen were Ted Bowley, Tom Cook, Duleepsinhji, and the two pairs of brothers James and John Langridge, Harry and Jim Parks Sr. Sussex had the future South African Test captain Alan Melville in their team during the mid-1930s. Sussex had one of the all-time great bowlers in Maurice Tate. Vallance Jupp played for them in the early 1920s and other good or useful bowlers were Bowley, Jim Cornford, George Cox Jr, James Langridge, Jim Parks and Albert Wensley. Sussex keeper George Street was killed in a road accident at the beginning of the 1924 season and Tich Cornford succeeded him.

=== Warwickshire ===
Warwickshire were bottom of the table in 1919 and, apart from a few seasons after 1930 when they reached the top ten (including a creditable fourth in 1934), were always in the bottom half. Warwickshire's best player was the England batsman Bob Wyatt. Other noted batsmen were Leonard Bates, Tom Dollery, Norman Kilner and Jack Parsons. Harry Howell was their best bowler in the 1920s. In the 1930s, Warwickshire had Joseph Mayer, George Paine and the young Eric Hollies. The wicket-keeper in the 1920s was Tiger Smith, who had made his debut in 1904; he was followed by Jack Smart and John Buckingham.

=== Worcestershire ===
Worcestershire chose not to compete in the chaotic 1919 season. Like Northants, they were perennial strugglers and picked up five wooden spoons. There was an improvement in 1939 when they won more than they lost for once and finished seventh. Their best batsmen were Harold Gibbons, Maurice Nichol and Cyril Walters. The Nawab of Pataudi was on their books in the 1930s but he only played one full season for them, 1933, when he scored 1,749 runs. Fred Root was the mainstay of the Worcestershire bowling through the 1920s when they also had the all-rounder Frederick Pearson. In the 1930s, Worcestershire's best bowlers were George Brook, Dick Howorth, Peter Jackson, Reg Perks and Sidney Martin. Syd Buller, later well known as a Test umpire, kept wicket for Worcestershire in the 1930s.

=== Yorkshire ===
Despite the presence in their team of some of cricket's greatest names, Yorkshire's professionalism and teamwork were the key ingredients in their remarkable run of success through the whole inter-war period. They won the title twelve times and their lowest placing was fifth. Captaincy was a factor and the issue of a professional captain arose in 1927. Before then, it was widely believed that, despite there being a nominal amateur captain, the arch-professional Wilfred Rhodes was the de facto captain aided by his lieutenant, the even archer-professional Emmott Robinson. The matter was never in doubt from 1933 when Brian Sellers was appointed; Yorkshire won six titles under his tenure and only Lord Hawke has been more successful.

Yorkshire were strong in all departments. The mainstay of the team was their world-class opening batsman Herbert Sutcliffe, whose career spanned the whole inter-war period. He had two significant opening partners in Percy Holmes and the young Len Hutton. Maurice Leyland was another regular England batsman and Yorkshire could also rely on Wilf Barber, Arthur Mitchell and Edgar Oldroyd. Opposing batsmen always knew that they would face a formidable attack, not least the two all-time greats Wilfred Rhodes through the 1920s and his successor Hedley Verity in the thirties. Yorkshire also called upon England bowlers George Macaulay, Roy Kilner, Abe Waddington, Bill Bowes and Frank Smailes. The redoubtable Emmott Robinson was a good bowler too, as was his namesake Ellis Robinson (no relation) in the late 1930s. Yorkshire's main wicket-keepers were Arthur Dolphin, who had made his debut in 1905, and Arthur Wood; they both played for England.

== Other first-class matches ==
Three traditional fixtures founded in the first half of the 19th century continued to be played during the inter-war years. Gentlemen v Players and the University Match were played annually, but North v South matches were reduced to ten in nine seasons. In addition, the Champion County match was an annual event to 1935.

== Individual achievements ==
Teams in the 1920s and 1930s played more first-class matches than in most other decades and so there was opportunity for top-class players to amass large totals of runs, wickets and dismissals. Any half-decent county player who was active throughout a season would reasonably be expected to score 1,000 runs in the season (if a recognised batsman), take 100 wickets (if a regular bowler) or dismiss 50 batsmen (if a wicket-keeper).

Scoring 3,000 runs in a season was considered a remarkable achievement and it was done fifteen times with another 42 instances of players scoring 2,500 runs. The highest season aggregate was 3,352 by Frank Woolley in 1928. Herbert Sutcliffe and Wally Hammond scored 3,000 three times; Patsy Hendren and Phil Mead twice; and it was done once each by Woolley, Les Ames, Jack Hobbs, Ernest Tyldesley and Jim Parks senior. Twenty triple-centuries were scored, the highest being 364 by Len Hutton in the final Test against Australia in 1938. The most was three by Hammond. Don Bradman, who played in three English seasons from 1930 to 1938, scored two, both in Test matches.

In a similar vein, taking 250 wickets in a season was also considered a remarkable achievement and this was done six times, all between 1928 and 1932 and all by the same player, Tich Freeman. His highest tally was 304 in 1928. Tom Goddard took 248 wickets in 1937 and the next highest was 228 by Maurice Tate in 1925. There were thirty instances in all of bowlers taking 200 wickets in a season. Freeman accounted for eight of these and Charlie Parker five. Goddard, Tate and Hedley Verity did it three times. The other eight instances were by Alf Gover (twice), Cec Parkin (twice), Alec Kennedy, Fred Root, Ted McDonald and George Macaulay. Ten wickets in an innings was achieved 22 times, including the world record analysis of ten for 10 by Verity in 1932. The next best returns were ten for 18 by George Geary in 1929 and ten for 36 by Verity, again, in 1931. Freeman took three tens, one in each season from 1929 to 1931. Verity was the only other bowler to do it twice. Two Australian tourists, Arthur Mailey in 1921 and Clarrie Grimmett in 1930, are among the other seventeen.

There were 45 instances of 75 dismissals in a season. 44 of these were by wicket-keepers, as would be expected, and one by a fielder. In 1928, Wally Hammond played in 35 matches and took 79 catches, all as a fielder. In the same season, Les Ames (122) and George Duckworth (107) both achieved the rare milestone of 100 dismissals in a season. Ames did even better in 1929, completing 128 dismissals, and in 1932 he completed 104. Ted Brooks achieved 75 dismissals six times. He was followed by Ames, Duckworth and Fred Price (five each); Harry Elliott and Arthur Wood (four each); Tich Cornford and Ben Lilley (three each); George Street (twice) and seven others at one apiece.

== Impact of the Second World War ==
The three-Test series in 1939 between England and the West Indies was completed on Tuesday, 22 August. This was the day before the signing of the Nazi-Soviet Pact, in reaction to which Great Britain formalised the Anglo-Polish military alliance on Friday, 25 August. The West Indians were due to play Sussex at Hove, starting on Saturday, 26 August. Another five matches, including one against Kent at the St Lawrence Ground, were planned until the tour was due to end on Tuesday, 12 September. In view of the international crisis, the West Indians decided to cancel the six remaining matches and sail for home. England did not play Test cricket again until they hosted India at Lord's in June 1946.

The 1939 County Championship was effectively over when the Second World War began. Six matches had started on Wednesday, 30 August and were still being played on Friday, 1 September, the day that Germany attacked Poland. One of them was Sussex v Yorkshire at Hove. This finished on the Friday morning, Yorkshire winning by nine wickets. That confirmed Yorkshire as county champions for the third successive season. The last three matches in the championship programme, scheduled to commence on Saturday, 2 September, were cancelled. The County Championship resumed in May 1946 and was again won by Yorkshire who thus held the title for ten years.

The 1939 Scarborough Festival, featuring three matches at North Marine Road, was cancelled. Yorkshire were due to play MCC on Saturday, 2 September. MCC had selected a team under the captaincy of Bob Wyatt. It included Ken Farnes who, like Yorkshire's Hedley Verity, would be a victim of the war. Gentlemen v Players was planned to start on Wednesday, 6 September, and H. D. G. Leveson Gower's XI against the already departed West Indians on Saturday, 9 September. That was meant to be the season finale, ending on Tuesday, 12 September. By then, many cricketers were wearing military uniforms. Herbert Sutcliffe, whose entire first-class career (apart from one charity match in 1945) spanned the 21 seasons of the inter-war period, had missed the final championship match at Hove because, as a reservist in the British Army, he was the first Yorkshire player to be called up.

== Cricket during World War II ==
The cancellation of first-class cricket lasted for the duration of the European conflict. There were no matches from 2 September 1939 until Saturday, 19 May 1945–11 days after VE Day.

== Bibliography ==
- Birley, Derek (1999). A Social History of English Cricket. London: Aurum Press. ISBN 978-18-54107-10-7 – via Internet Archive.
- Coldham, James P. (1990). Lord Hawke – A Cricketing Biography. Marlborough: Crowood Press. ISBN 978-18-52233-05-1.
- Harte, Chris (1993). A History of Australian Cricket. London: André Deutsch. ISBN 978-02-33988-25-2.
- Hill, Alan (1991). Herbert Sutcliffe: Cricket Maestro. New York City: Simon & Schuster. ISBN 978-18-03990-94-1.
- Webber, Roy (1957). The County Cricket Championship: A history of the competition from 1873 to the present day. Charing Cross, London: Phoenix House Ltd. OCLC 2853776.
