= 1930 English cricket season =

1930 was the 37th season of County Championship cricket in England and will always be remembered for the remarkable batting performances of Australia's Don Bradman. Australia won the Test series 2–1. Lancashire regained the championship to complete four titles in five seasons.

== Honours ==
- County Championship – Lancashire
- Minor Counties Championship – Durham
- Wisden – Don Bradman, Clarrie Grimmett, Beverley Lyon, Ian Peebles, Maurice Turnbull

== Test series ==
England lost the Ashes to Australia by 2–1 with two matches drawn. Australia needed to win the final Test at The Oval to win the series and regain the Ashes, and did so by an innings in a match that went into the sixth day (as the series was in doubt, it was to be played to a finish). Don Bradman, with 974 runs in the series (unequalled in all Test cricket), was the main difference between two strong teams. Clarrie Grimmett took 29 wickets in the series, though - oddly - ten of those were in the only Test that Australia lost (the first).

Cumulative record - Test wins	1876–1930
England	47
Australia	50
Drawn	27

== Leading batsmen ==
1930 English cricket season – leading batsmen by average
Name	Innings	Runs	Highest	Average	100s
Don Bradman	36	2960	334	98.66	10
Herbert Sutcliffe	44	2312	173	64.22	6
Alan Kippax	32	1451	158	58.04	4
Bill Woodfull	26	1434	216	57.36	6
K. S. Duleepsinhji	48	2562	333	56.93	9
Wally Hammond	44	2032	211*	53.47	5
Edgar Oldroyd	33	1285	164*	51.40	3
Jack Hobbs	43	2103	146*	51.29	5

1930 English cricket season – leading batsmen by aggregate
Name	Innings	Runs	Highest	Average	100s
Don Bradman	36	2960	334	98.66	10
K. S. Duleepsinhji	48	2562	333	56.93	9
Herbert Sutcliffe	44	2312	173	64.22	6
Andy Sandham	50	2295	204	49.89	6
Maurice Leyland	50	2175	211*	50.58	6
Dodger Whysall	47	2174	248	49.40	8

== Leading bowlers ==
Charlie Parker was the leading bowler with 179 wickets @ 12.84 though Tich Freeman took 275 wickets @ 16.84.

1930 English cricket season – leading bowlers by average*
Name	Balls	Maidens	Runs	Wickets	Average
Hedley Verity	2437	154	795	64	12.42
Charlie Parker	6099	301	2299	179	12.84
Dick Tyldesley	6313	352	2263	140	16.16
Harold Larwood	3726	124	1622	99	16.38
Frank Booth	1131	47	432	26	16.61

- With more than 20 first-class wickets.

1930 English cricket season – leading bowlers by aggregate
Name	Balls	Maidens	Runs	Wickets	Average
Tich Freeman	11487	472	4632	275	16.84
Charlie Parker	6099	301	2299	179	12.84
Clarrie Grimmett	6091	262	2427	144	16.85
Tom Goddard	8414	435	2819	144	19.57
Dick Tyldesley	6313	352	2263	140	16.16
Tommy Mitchell	6614	311	2526	138	18.30

== Annual reviews ==
- Wisden Cricketers' Almanack 1931
