= 100 wickets in a season =

100 wickets in a season is a notable feat in the sport of cricket, achieved by bowlers. It refers to having taken 100 wickets in first-class cricket only, although some individuals have managed to do so in County Championship matches alone, which is more challenging.

The feat has only rarely been achieved anywhere other than in England, due to the smaller number of fixtures elsewhere. In England, since the number of games in the County Championship was greatly reduced in 1969, the feat has become rare.

| Season | Wickets | Player |
|---|---|---|
| 1933 | 252 | Tich Freeman |
| 1930 | 249 | Tich Freeman |
| 1931 | 241 | Tich Freeman |
| 1895 | 239 | Tom Richardson |
| 1897 | 238 | Tom Richardson |
| 1928 | 216 | Tich Freeman |
| 1910 | 215 | Razor Smith |
| 1937 | 215 | Tom Goddard |
| 1932 | 209 | Tich Freeman |
| 1900 | 206 | Wilfred Rhodes |
| 1947 | 206 | Tom Goddard |
| 1931 | 205 | Charlie Parker |
| 1935 | 201 | Tich Freeman |
| 1925 | 200 | Charlie Parker |
| 1929 | 199 | Tich Freeman |
| 1926 | 198 | Charlie Parker |
| 1901 | 196 | Wilfred Rhodes |
| 1925 | 196 | Fred Root |
| 1922 | 195 | Charlie Parker |
| 1922 | 194 | Tich Freeman |
| 1925 | 194 | Maurice Tate |
| 1896 | 191 | Tom Richardson |
| 1935 | 189 | Tom Goddard |
| 1934 | 187 | Tich Freeman |
| 1907 | 184 | George Dennett |
| 1924 | 184 | Charlie Parker |
| 1927 | 183 | Charlie Parker |
| 1895 | 182 | Arthur Mold |
| 1906 | 182 | George Hirst |
| 1925 | 182 | Ted McDonald |
| 1939 | 181 | Tom Goddard |
| 1954 | 179 | Bruce Dooland |
| 1909 | 178 | Colin Blythe |
| 1928 | 178 | Ted McDonald |
| 1922 | 177 | Alec Kennedy |
| 1923 | 176 | Cecil Parkin |
| 1925 | 176 | George Macaulay |
| 1911 | 175 | Harry Dean |
| 1946 | 175 | Eric Hollies |
| 1923 | 174 | Maurice Tate |
| 1921 | 172 | Jack Newman |
| 1922 | 172 | Cecil Parkin |
| 1936 | 171 | Alf Gover |
| 1912 | 170 | Colin Blythe |
| 1933 | 170 | Tom Goddard |
| 1937 | 170 | Johnnie Clay |
| 1905 | 169 | Walter Lees |
| 1922 | 169 | Len Richmond |
| 1924 | 169 | Cecil Parkin |
| 1951 | 169 | Bob Appleyard |
| 1955 | 169 | George Tribe |
| 1921 | 168 | Alec Kennedy |
| 1908 | 167 | Colin Blythe |
| 1923 | 167 | Charlie Parker |
| 1938 | 167 | Arthur Wellard |
| 1923 | 165 | Fred Root |
| 1939 | 165 | Hedley Verity |
| 1920 | 164 | Frank Woolley |
| 1920 | 164 | Alec Kennedy |
| 1926 | 163 | Ted McDonald |
| 1926 | 163 | Tich Freeman |
| 1948 | 163 | Tom Pritchard |
| 1950 | 163 | Roy Tattersall |
| 1930 | 162 | Charlie Parker |
| 1935 | 161 | Hedley Verity |
| 1958 | 161 | Derek Shackleton |
| 1962 | 161 | Derek Shackleton |
| 1906 | 160 | George Dennett |
| 1932 | 160 | Bill Bowes |
| 1935 | 160 | Tommy Mitchell |
| 1914 | 159 | Colin Blythe |
| 1924 | 159 | George Macaulay |
| 1932 | 159 | Tom Goddard |
| 1906 | 158 | Arthur Fielder |
| 1913 | 158 | Major Booth |
| 1927 | 158 | Tich Freeman |
| 1952 | 158 | Johnny Wardle |
| 1937 | 157 | Hedley Verity |
| 1948 | 157 | Jack Walsh |
| 1908 | 156 | George Hirst |
| 1910 | 156 | Jack Newman |
| 1921 | 156 | Charlie Parker |
| 1921 | 156 | Tich Freeman |
| 1923 | 156 | Alec Kennedy |
| 1956 | 156 | Don Shepherd |
| 1900 | 154 | Albert Trott |
| 1905 | 154 | George Cox |
| 1906 | 154 | Walter Lees |
| 1913 | 154 | Bill Hitch |
| 1929 | 154 | Tom Goddard |
| 1902 | 153 | Fred Tate |
| 1907 | 153 | Albert Hallam |
| 1913 | 153 | George Dennett |
| 1933 | 153 | Hedley Verity |
| 1936 | 153 | Hedley Verity |
| 1947 | 153 | Peter Smith |
| 1957 | 153 | Tony Lock |
| 1961 | 153 | Derek Shackleton |
| 1911 | 152 | Razor Smith |
| 1921 | 152 | Ewart Astill |
| 1923 | 152 | Harry Howell |
| 1949 | 152 | Tom Goddard |
| 1953 | 152 | Bruce Dooland |
| 1907 | 151 | Arthur Fielder |
| 1952 | 151 | Cliff Gladwin |
| 1920 | 150 | Lawrence Cook |
| 1934 | 150 | George Paine |
| 1946 | 150 | Tom Goddard |

== Notes ==
RADFORD 1985 109 WICKETS

RADFORD 1987 101 WICKETS
