= List of Gloucestershire first-class cricket records =

This is a list of Gloucestershire first-class cricket records; that is, record team and individual performances in first-class cricket for Gloucestershire.

== Team records ==
=== Highest innings total ===
Rank	Score	Opponent	Season
1	695-9d	Middlesex	2004
2	653-6d	Glamorgan	1928
3	650-8d	Leicester Grace Road	2007
4	646	Bristol	2014
5	643-5d	Bristol	1946
Source: Gloucestershire County Cricket Club

=== Lowest innings total ===
Rank	Score	Opponent	Season
1	17	Cheltenham College	1896
2	22	Bristol	1920
3	25	Cheltenham College	1891
4	31	Tonbridge	1903
5	31	Bristol Greenbank	1924
Source: Gloucestershire County Cricket Club

=== Tied matches ===
- Gloucestershire v. Australians at Bristol 1930
- Essex v. Gloucestershire at Leyton 1959
- Derbyshire v. Gloucestershire at Bristol 1987

== Batting records ==
=== Highest individual scores ===
Rank	Score	Player	Opponent	Season
1	341	Craig Spearman	Middlesex	2004
2	318	W. G. Grace	Yorkshire	1876
3	317	Wally Hammond	Nottinghamshire	1936
4	302	Wally Hammond	Glamorgan	1934
5	302	Wally Hammond	Glamorgan	1939
Source: Gloucestershire County Cricket Club

=== Most runs in a season ===
Rank	Runs	Player	Season
1	2860	Wally Hammond	1933
2	2637	Wally Hammond	1927
3	2583	Wally Hammond	1928
4	2571	Wally Hammond	1937
5	2554	Zaheer Abbas	1976
Source: Cricket Archive

== Bowling records ==
=== Most wickets ===
Rank	Wickets	Player
1	3170	Charlie Parker
2	2862	Tom Goddard
3	2082	George Dennett
4	1768	Sam Cook
5	1696	John Mortimore
Source: Cricket Archive
