= John Buckingham =

John Buckingham may refer to:

- John Bokyngham (died 1398), treasury official and Bishop of Lincoln
- John Buckingham (chemist) (1943–2015), British chemist and author of chemical dictionaries
- Jack Buckingham (John Buckingham, 1903–1987), English cricketer and footballer
- John Buckingham (MP), in 1416 MP for Northampton (UK Parliament constituency)
- John Buckingham (jockey) (1940–2016), rider of Foinavon, winner of the 1967 Grand National
