= Brian Edmeades =

English cricketer (born 1941)

Personal information
- Full name: Brian Ernest Arthur Edmeades
- Born: 17 September 1941 (age 85); Matlock, Derbyshire
- Batting: Right-handed
- Bowling: Right-arm medium
- Role: All rounder

Domestic team information
- Years: Team
- 1961–1976: Essex

Career statistics
Competition	First-class	List A
Matches	335	155
Runs scored	12,593	2,728
Batting average	25.91	23.72
100s/50s	14/61	1/13
Top score	163	125*
Balls bowled	9,688	3,818
Wickets	374	167
Bowling average	25.90	22.86
5 wickets in innings	10	1
10 wickets in match	1	0
Best bowling	7/37	5/22
Catches/stumpings	105/0	22/0
- Source: CricInfo, 28 November 2011

Brian Ernest Arthur Edmeades (born 17 September 1941) is a former English cricketer who enjoyed a successful county cricket career with Essex between 1961 and 1976. Edmeades was an all rounder who went on to score over 15,000 runs, including 15 centuries, and took 500 wickets for his county.

== Career ==
A right-hand bat and right-arm medium bowler born in Matlock, Derbyshire, in 1941, Edmeades began playing for the Essex Second XI in 1958, impressing enough to be awarded a First XI appearance in 1961 and his full cap in 1965. He took 100 wickets in a season in 1966, and he scored over 1000 runs in a season on five occasions: 1967, 1969, 1970, 1972 and 1975. The last occasion was also his benefit year with Essex, which raised £12,000.
