= Cricket in England =

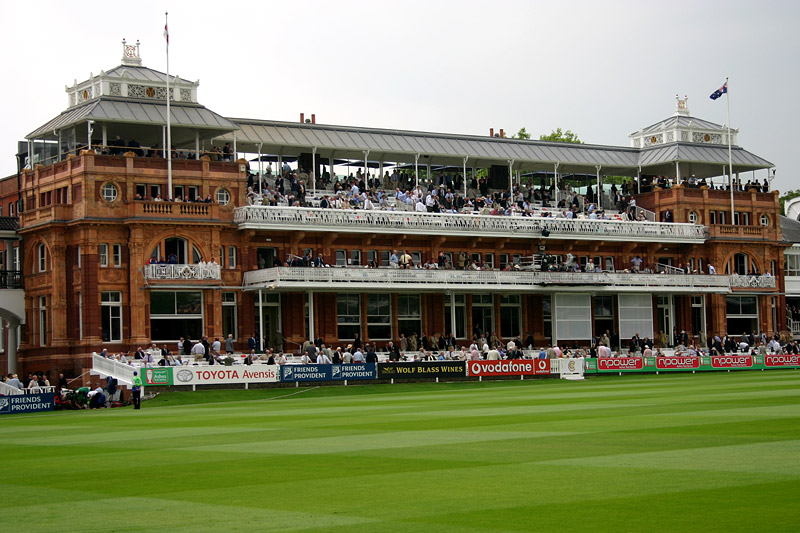
- Lord's Cricket Ground in London, the spiritual home of cricket and one of the premier cricket grounds in England and Wales
- Country: England
- Governing body: England and Wales Cricket Board
- National teams: England Men's; England Women's; England U-19 Men; England U-19 Women; England Lions; England A women

National competitions
- List: First Class Cricket; County Championship; List A Cricket; One Day Cup; One Day Cup (women's); T20 Cricket; T20 Blast; Women's Twenty20 Cup; Women's T20 Blast; The Hundred

International competitions
- List: Men's national team; ICC World Test Championship; Cricket World Cup: Champions (2019); ICC T20 World Cup: Champions (2010, 2022); ICC Champions Trophy: Runners-up (2004, 2013); Cricket at the Summer Olympics: Gold Medal (1900); Men's U-19 national team; Under-19 Cricket World Cup: Champions (1998); Women's national team; Women's Cricket World Cup: Champions (1973, 1993, 2009, 2017); ICC Women's T20 World Cup: Champions (2009); Commonwealth Games: 4th (2022); Women's U-19 national team; ICC Women's Under-19 Cricket World Cup: Runners-up (2023)

Cricket is one of the most popular sports in England, having been played since the 16th century. Marylebone Cricket Club, based at Lord's Cricket Ground in London, developed the modern rules of play and conduct and the sport is now administered by the England and Wales Cricket Board. English cricket is represented at the international level by the various England men's teams and England women's teams. At the domestic level teams are mostly organised by county, competing in tournaments such as the County Championship, Metro Bank One-Day Cup, T20 Blast, the Women's Twenty20 Cup, The Hundred for both men and women, as well as within a regional structure for women's cricket. Recreational matches are organised on a regional basis, with the top level being the ECB Premier Leagues.

== History ==
- History of cricket to 1725
- History of English cricket (1726–1750)
- History of English cricket (1751–1775)
- History of English cricket (1776–1800)
- History of English cricket (1801–1825)
- History of English cricket (1826–1845)
- History of English cricket (1846–1863)
- History of English cricket (1864–1918)
- History of English cricket (1919–1945)
- History of English cricket since 1945

== Organisation ==
The England and Wales Cricket Board (ECB) is the governing body of cricket in England and Wales, and hence governs the various England cricket teams. The ECB was created on 1 January 1997 and combines the roles of the now superseded Test and County Cricket Board (TCCB), National Cricket Association (NCA), and the Cricket Council.

The ECB has been a full member of the international governing body for world cricket, the International Cricket Council (ICC), since 1909, and is a member of ICC Europe.

== International cricket ==
National teams of England
- England Men: England Women
- England U-19 Men: England U-19 Women
- England Lions: England A Women

The various men's and women's England cricket teams represent England and Wales in three forms of international cricket: Test, One Day International, and Twenty20.

Test is the oldest form of cricket played at international level, and is played by teams representing full member nations of the ICC. A Test is scheduled to take place over a period of up to five days, although until the 1930s timeless Tests – i.e. without a time limit – were played.

One Day International (ODI) is a form of cricket played between two teams with international status in which each team faces a fixed number of fifty overs, with games lasting up to 7 hours.

Twenty20 International (T20 International) is a form of cricket played between two teams with international status in which each team plays a single innings against their opponent, facing a maximum of twenty overs.

International cricket in England follows a fixed pattern whereby English teams schedule tours in other countries during the winter and play at home against visiting teams during the summer.

=== Men's teams ===
As of December 2024 the England men's team had played more Test matches than any other team, winning 400 of their 1083 games, drawing 355, and losing 328. With 36.9 per cent of their matches won, England were then the third most successful team in the history of Test cricket after Australia on 47.8 per cent and South Africa on 38.9 per cent.

The England men's team played their first ODI in 1971 against Australia and reached the finals of the ODI Cricket World Cup in 1987 and 1992. They won their first title in 2019, beating New Zealand in the final in England.

The England men's team played their first T20 International in 2005 against Australia in May 2010, winning their first-ever ICC Men's T20 World Cup the same year by beating arch-rivals Australia by 7 wickets in the final in England. They also won the ICC Men's T20 World Cup in 2022, defeating Pakistan in the final.

Tournament	Appearance in finals	Last appearance	Best performance
ICC Men's Cricket World Cup	4 out of 13	2023	Champions (2019)
ICC Men's T20 World Cup	3 out of 9	2024	Champions (2010, 2022)
Olympics	1 out of 1	1900	Gold Medal (1900)
ICC Champions Trophy	2 out of 8	2017	Runners-up (2004, 2013)
ICC World Test Championship	0 out of 3	2023–25	4th (2019–21, 2021–23)

=== Women's teams ===
The England women's cricket team represents England and Wales in international women's cricket matches and has been participating in international cricket since 1909. They made their debut in Tests in 1934 against Australia, with their greatest Test rivalry still being against Australia in what is called the Women's Ashes.

The England women's team played their first ODI in 1973 against the International XI women's cricket team. They have been participating in the ODI Women's Cricket World Cup since it was first held in 1973, when they won by beating Australia in the points table. Winning again in 1993, 2009, and 2017, they have won the second-most Women's Cricket World Cup titles after Australia, and in 2017 they won the trophy by beating India by 9 runs in the final.

The England women's team played in the first ever Twenty20 International for either men or women, against New Zealand at Hove, and also won the inaugural World Twenty20 in 2009, beating New Zealand by 6 wickets in the final in England. Since then they have consistently reached the finals but have failed to clinch the title on multiple occasions, recording their worst performance in the 2024 Women's T20 World Cup.

Tournament	Appearance in finals	Last appearance	Best performance
ICC Women's Cricket World Cup	8 out of 12	2022	Champions (1973, 1993, 2009, 2017)
ICC Women's T20 World Cup	4 out of 9	2024	Champions (2009)
Commonwealth Games	0 out of 1	2022	4th (2022)

=== Under-19 men's teams ===
Tournament	Appearance in finals	Last appearance	Best performance
ICC Under-19 Cricket World Cup	2 out of 15	2024	Champions (1998)

=== Under-19 women's teams ===
Tournament	Appearance in finals	Last appearance	Best performance
Under-19 Women's T20 World Cup	1 out of 1	2023	

== Domestic cricket ==
At a domestic level there are eighteen professional county cricket clubs, seventeen of them in England and one in Wales, all named after and originally representative of historic counties. These clubs are heavily dependent on subsidies from the ECB, which earns revenue from television coverage, endorsement contracts, and attendances at international matches.

The English cricket season traditionally starts at the beginning of April and runs through to the second half of September, although in recent years counties have played pre-season friendly matches at the very end of March.

In the county cricket competition, the following games are considered derbies:

- Roses Match – Yorkshire v Lancashire
- Battle of London (Cross-Thames Derby) – Middlesex v Surrey
- Battle of the Bridge – Essex v Kent
- South Coast Special (El Clasicoast) – Hampshire v Sussex
- West Midlands Derby – Warwickshire v Worcestershire
- West Country Derby – Somerset v Gloucestershire
- East Midlands Derby – Nottinghamshire v Derbyshire
- North Derby – Yorkshire v Durham

=== Men's first-class competitions ===
Locations of current County Championship teams

The County Championship is the only domestic first-class cricket competition in England and Wales, and is organised by the ECB as a two-league system involving all 18 of the men's cricket teams representing the historic counties of England and Wales. The County Championship was constituted on 16 December 1889 when secretaries of the major clubs gathered at Lord's to decide the following season's fixtures, while at the same time representatives of the eight leading counties met privately to determine how teams would be ranked. The new competition began in the 1890 season and at first involved just the eight leading clubs: Gloucestershire, Kent, Lancashire, Middlesex, Nottinghamshire, Surrey, Sussex, and Yorkshire. The championship has since been expanded to 18 clubs by the addition at various times of Derbyshire, Durham, Essex, Glamorgan, Hampshire, Leicestershire, Northamptonshire, Somerset, Warwickshire, and Worcestershire. Counties without first-class status compete in the National Counties Cricket Championship.

The Champion County match is traditionally played between the winner of the previous season's County Championship and the Marylebone Cricket Club (MCC). The match was played at Lord's Cricket Ground for many seasons, but from 2010 to 2017 it took place at the Sheikh Zayed Stadium in Abu Dhabi. The 2018 match was played at the Kensington Oval ground in Bridgetown, Barbados.

=== Men's limited-overs competition ===
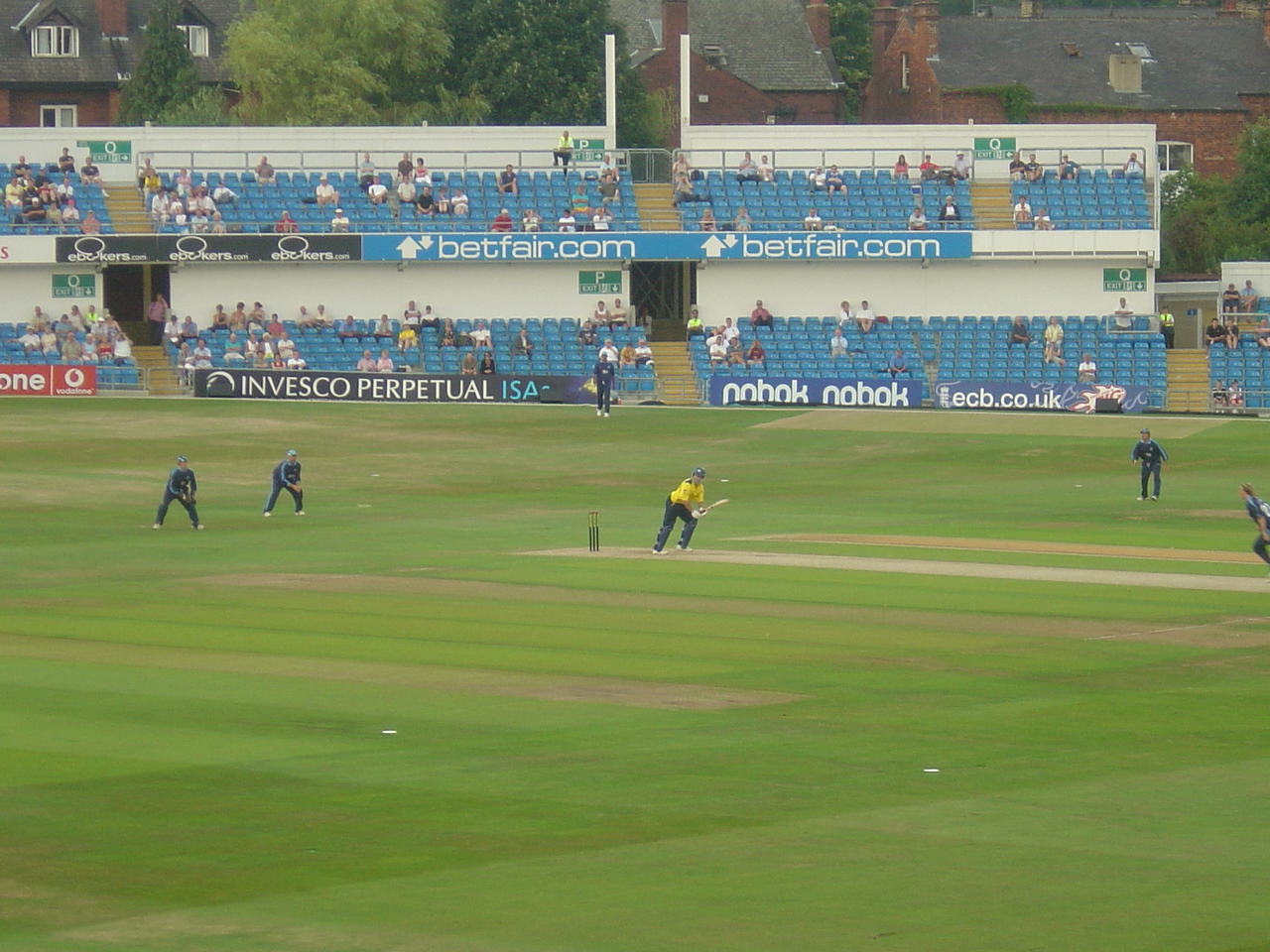
Yorkshire v Surrey at the Headingley Cricket Ground in Leeds in 2005

The One-Day Cup is a 50-overs-per-side competition for the English and Welsh first-class counties, and began in 2014 as a replacement for the ECB 40 tournament held from 2010 to 2013. In contrast to its 40-over predecessor, the number of overs per innings was set at 50 to bring the competition in line with One-Day Internationals. The competition begins with a round-robin tournament featuring two groups of nine. The groups were originally organised geographically with a North group and a South group, but since 2021 the groups have been decided by a draw. As of 2024 the top three teams in each group progress to the knock-out stage of the competition. The final was held at Lord's until 2020, when it was moved to Trent Bridge.

=== Men's Twenty20 competition ===
The T20 Blast is a professional Twenty20 cricket league in England and Wales, established by the ECB in 2003 and the oldest domestic T20 league in the world. The T20 Blast comprises 18 teams – 17 in England and 1 in Wales – and is one of the top-level Twenty20 leagues in the world.

=== Women's limited-over competition ===
The Women's County Championship was a one-day competition competed for by counties which ended in 2019. The introduction of a new regional domestic structure for women's cricket in 2020 resulted in the establishment of the Women's One-Day Cup, a professional county league of 50-over matches between eight teams each representing a region of England and Wales and competing for the Rachael Heyhoe Flint Trophy from 2020 to 2024.

=== Women's Twenty20 competitions ===
The Women's Cricket Super League was established as a Twenty20 competition with six franchise teams, but was succeeded by the Women's Twenty20 Cup in 2020 when the new regional domestic structure for women's cricket was introduced. From 2009 to the end of the 2019 season, teams in the Women's Twenty20 Cup were organised in tiered divisions, with a national winner. But following the 2020 reorganisation, the 35 teams – that mostly represent counties – now compete for the Charlotte Edwards Cup.

The Women's T20 Blast is a knockout Twenty20 competition organised by the ECB.

=== 100-ball competitions ===
The Hundred is a professional league with both men's and women's competitions, and is the only prominent cricket league in the world that plays the 100-ball format. It is held annually in July and August. The Hundred involves eight non-county teams, with seven in England and one in Wales: Birmingham Phoenix, London Spirit, Manchester Originals, Northern Superchargers, Oval Invincibles, Southern Brave, Trent Rockets, and Welsh Fire.

== University cricket ==
=== University first-class matches ===
Oxford and Cambridge universities played their first match against each other in 1827, with the combined Oxford and Cambridge Universities team played 18 first class matches against touring sides from 1839 to 1992, including two before official first class status started. After the advent of first class cricket in 1895, matches between Oxford and Cambridge – or between either of those universities and another first class side – were considered first class matches, with that status also applied retroactively to earlier matches.

First class counties started playing matches at other universities in the 1980s, beginning with Nottinghamshire vs Durham University at The Racecourse in 1981, but these were not granted first class status. The Combined Universities team ("British Universities" from 1995), which was originally formed from Oxford and Cambridge but from 1987 including other universities, played in the limited overs Benson & Hedges Cup from 1975 to 1998 and played 13 first class matches against touring sides from 1993 to 2006. The MCC Universities (MCCU) team played various matches from 2007 to 2017, including in the Second XI Championship from 2009 to 2017.

=== University Centres of Cricketing Excellence ===
The first University Centre of Cricketing Excellence (UCCE) was established at Durham University by Graeme Fowler in 1996. The success of the Durham centre led to it being adopted as a national model by the ECB in October 2000, with the establishment of six UCCE sides: Durham and Loughborough each based around a single university, and four more teams bringing together players from multiple institutions. Starting in 2001, the UCCE sides played in a two-day match competition with a final at Lord's. After 2001, when the Oxford and Cambridge matches against the counties were no longer considered first class games, each UCCE played three early-season matches against county sides. These acted as pre-season warm-ups for the counties, and were also considered first class matches for Oxford, Cambridge, and Durham UCCEs, with matches between counties and Loughborough UCCE also considered first class from 2003.

The MCC took over funding of the UCCE scheme from 2005, and from 2010 the UCCEs were rebranded as MCC University (MCCU) teams. A further re-arrangement in 2012 granted first-class status to all six MCCUs, but only for two of the three matches against county sides each season. The MCC ceased funding the programme in 2020 and the organisation transferred back to the ECB. The matches between the MCCUs and counties, and the annual University Match between Oxford and Cambridge, were no longer considered first class matches after 2020. No MCCU matches were played in 2020 due to COVID, although the last first class Oxford-Cambridge match was played that September.

=== "English University Matches" ===
As of 2022, pre-season matches with first class counties are played under the name of English University Matches according to the ECB website, although Wisden Cricketers' Almanack uses the term ECB University Matches, and Exeter has been added to the universities participating. Both the ECB and Wisden list the university teams participating in these pre-season matches as MCCUs, but they compete in British Universities and Colleges Sport (BUCS) limited-over matches as UCCEs. As of 2022, inter-university matches outside of BUCS and the Oxford-Cambridge match have not resumed after COVID. The 2023 and 2024 County versus UCCE Matches continued to include Exeter, but Cambridge UCCE did not participate and have not played any matches as Cambridge UCCE since 2022, either against counties or in BUCS competitions. From the 2022 season onwards the Oxford UCCE men's team was replaced in BUCS by the single-institution Oxford Brookes UCCE.

=== University first-class teams ===
The university teams that have played first-class cricket are listed below, together with the dates when they held that status, the universities they represented, and the number of first class matches they played:

==== Teams representing a single university ====
- Cambridge University CC: 1817^{a}–2020; Cambridge University; 1479 matches^{b}
- Oxford University CC: 1827^{a}–2020; Oxford University; 1366 matches^{b}
- Durham UCCE/MCCU: 2001–2020; Durham University; 48 matches
- Loughborough UCCE/MCCU: 2003–2020; Loughborough University; 41 matches

^{a} Date of earliest first class match listed on the Cricket Archive; formal first class status from 1895.
^{b} Includes matches prior to 1895 regarded as first class by the Cricket Archive; see First-class cricket § Retrospective classification of matches played before the definitions.

==== Teams representing multiple universities ====
- Oxford and Cambridge Universities cricket team: 1839^{a}–1992; Oxford and Cambridge university; 18 matches^{b}
- Combined Universities/British Universities cricket team: 1993–2006; all UK universities; 13 matches
- Cambridge UCCE/MCCU: 2001–2020; Cambridge and Anglia Ruskin universities; 48 matches
- Oxford UCCE/MCCU: 2001–2020; Oxford and Oxford Brookes universities; 47 matches
- Cardiff MCCU: 2012–2020; Cardiff, Cardiff Met, and South Wales universities; 16 matches
- Leeds/Bradford MCCU: 2012–2020; Leeds, Leeds Beckett, and Bradford universities, and Bradford College; 14 matches

^{a} Date of earliest first class match listed on the Cricket Archive; formal first class status from 1895.
^{b} Includes two matches prior to 1895 regarded as first class by the Cricket Archive; see First-class cricket § Retrospective classification of matches played before the definitions.

== Recreational club competitions ==
The ECB runs a national club knock-out competition, the ECB National Club Cricket Championship, and has in place a regional Premier League pyramid system for recreational club cricket in England and Wales.

== Stadiums ==
The largest English cricket ground is Lord's in London, internationally regarded as the "home of cricket". Test matches have been played at 24 grounds across the country, with five of these grounds having hosted both men's and women's Tests: The Oval (South London), Old Trafford (Manchester), Trent Bridge (Nottingham), Headingley (Leeds) and Edgbaston (Birmingham). The other grounds to have hosted a Test match since 2010 are Sir Paul Getty's Ground (Wormsley Park), St Lawrence Ground (Canterbury), County Ground, Taunton, Bristol County Ground, Sophia Gardens (Cardiff), the Rose Bowl (Southampton) and Riverside Ground (Chester-le-Street).

The cricket grounds of England and Wales are smaller than the largest in some other countries, especially India and Australia. However, the best of them have been modernised to a high standard, and two new international grounds have been built in recent years.

== Popularity ==
Cricket is one of the most popular participation sports in England after football, rugby, and tennis, with most villages fielding a side every Sunday through the season, and towns fielding two, three, four, and occasionally five sides for Saturday league matches, and one or two sides on a Sunday. According to the mid-year 2020-21 Active Sport England survey, an estimated 181,500 people played cricket at least twice a month, representing a 0.4% decrease compared to the previous year.

Around 65% of the population of England follow cricket, and in 2005 the ECB concluded a commercial arrangement with BSkyB granting Sky exclusive television broadcast rights for live Test cricket in England for the four years of the 2006 to 2009 seasons. This deal took live Test cricket for home England matches away from terrestrial television for the first time and was criticised by many England cricket supporters and others, even though it generated substantial future revenues for English cricket.

The Cricket Writers' Club Young Cricketer of the Year is an annual award voted by the Cricket Writers' Club for the best young cricket player in England and Wales, and has been awarded since 1950.

== Attendances ==
In 2023 the average attendance at top-flight league matches was 9,750, and the cricket club with the highest average attendance was London Spirit, with 14,267.

== International competitions hosted ==
Competition	Edition	Winner	Runners-up	England's position	Venues	Final venue
Men's senior competitions
ICC Men's Cricket World Cup	1975 Cricket World Cup	West Indies	Australia	Semi-finals	6 ( in 5 cities)	Lord's
ICC Men's Cricket World Cup	1979 Cricket World Cup	West Indies	England	Runners-up	6 ( in 5 cities)	Lord's
ICC Men's Cricket World Cup	1983 Cricket World Cup	India	West Indies	Semi-finals	15 ( in 14 cities)	Lord's
ICC Men's Cricket World Cup	1999 Cricket World Cup	Australia	Pakistan	Group Stage	19 ( in 3 countries)	Lord's
ICC Champions Trophy	2004 ICC Champions Trophy	West Indies	England	Runners-up	3 (in 3 cities)	The Oval
ICC Men's T20 World Cup	2009 ICC World Twenty20	Pakistan	Sri Lanka	Super 8	3 (in 2 cities)	Lord's
ICC Champions Trophy	2013 ICC Champions Trophy	India	England	Runners-up	3 (in 3 cities)	Edgbaston
ICC Champions Trophy	2017 ICC Champions Trophy	Pakistan	India	Semi-finals	3 (in 3 cities)	The Oval
ICC Men's Cricket World Cup	2019 Cricket World Cup	England	New Zealand	Champions	11 ( in 10 cities)	Lord's
ICC World Test Championship	2019–2021 ICC World Test Championship	New Zealand	India	4th	1 (in 1 city) (final)	Rose Bowl
ICC World Test Championship	2021–2023 ICC World Test Championship	Australia	India	4th	1 (in 1 city) (final)	The Oval
ICC World Test Championship	2023–2025 ICC World Test Championship	South Africa	Australia	5th	1 (in 1 city) (final)	Lord's
Women's senior competitions
ICC Women's Cricket World Cup	1973 Women's Cricket World Cup	England	Australia	Champions	21 (in 20 cities)	Edgbaston
ICC Women's Cricket World Cup	1993 Women's Cricket World Cup	England	New Zealand	Champions	25 (in 16 cities)	Lord's
ICC Women's T20 World Cup	2009 ICC Women's World Twenty20	New Zealand	England	Runners-up	4 (in 3 cities)	Lord's
ICC Women's Cricket World Cup	2017 Women's Cricket World Cup	England	India	Champions	5 (in 5 cities)	Lord's
Commonwealth Games	Cricket at the 2022 Commonwealth Games	Australia	West Indies	4th	1 (in 1 city)	Edgbaston
ICC Women's T20 World Cup	2026 ICC Women's T20 World Cup	Australia	England	Runners-up	7 (in 6 cities)	Lord's

== Performance in international competitions ==
A red box around the year indicates tournaments played within England

Key
Champions
Runners-up
Semi-finals

=== Men's team ===
==== ICC World Test Championship ====
ICC World Test Championship record
Year	League stage										Final host	Final	Final position
Year	Pos	Matches					Ded	PC	Pts	PCT	Final host	Final	Final position
Year	Pos	P	W	L	D	T	Ded	PC	Pts	PCT	Final host	Final	Final position
2019–21	4/9	21	11	7	3	0	0	720	442	61.4	Rose Bowl, England	DNQ	League Stage
2021–23	4/9	22	10	8	4	0	12	264	124	47	The Oval, England	DNQ	League Stage

==== ICC Cricket World Cup ====
World Cup record
Year	Round	Position	GP	W	L	T	NR	Win %
(England) 1975	Semi-final	3/8	4	3	1	0	0	75.00
(England) 1979	Runners-up	2/8	5	4	1	0	0	80.00
(England) (Wales) 1983	Semi-final	3/8	7	5	2	0	0	71.43
(India) (Pakistan) 1987	Runners-up	2/8	8	5	3	0	0	62.50
(Australia) (New Zealand) 1992	Runners-up	2/9	10	6	3	0	1	66.67
(India) (Pakistan) (Sri Lanka) 1996	Quarter-final	8/12	6	2	4	0	0	33.33
(England) (Wales) (Scotland) (Republic of Ireland) (Netherlands) 1999	Group Stage	8/12	5	3	2	0	0	60.00
(South Africa) (Zimbabwe) (Kenya) 2003	Group Stage	9/14	6	3	3	0	0	50.00
(Cricket West Indies) 2007	Super 8	5/16	9	5	4	0	0	55.55
(India) (Sri Lanka) (Bangladesh) 2011	Quarter-final	7/14	7	3	3	1	0	50.00
(Australia) (New Zealand) 2015	Group Stage	10/14	6	2	4	0	0	33.33
(England) (Wales) 2019	Champions	1/10	11	8	3	0	0	68.18
(India) 2023	Group Stage	7/10	9	3	6	0	0	33.33
(South Africa) (Zimbabwe) (Namibia) 2027	TBD							
(India) (Bangladesh) 2031	TBD							
Total	1 title	13/13	93	52	39	1	1	56.45

*The win percentage excludes no results and counts ties as half a win.

==== ICC T20 World Cup ====
T20 World Cup record
Year	Round	Position	GP	W	L	T	NR	Win %
(South Africa) 2007	Super 8	7/12	5	1	4	0	0	20.00
(England) (Wales) 2009	Super 8	6/12	5	2	3	0	0	40.00
(Cricket West Indies) 2010	Champions	1/12	7	5	1	0	1	83.33
(Sri Lanka) 2012	Super 8	6/12	5	2	3	0	0	40.00
(Bangladesh) 2014	Super 10	7/16	4	1	3	0	0	25.00
(India) 2016	Runners-up	2/16	6	4	2	0	0	66.67
(United Arab Emirates) (Oman) 2021	Semi-final	4/16	6	4	2	0	0	66.67
(Australia) 2022	Champions	1/16	7	5	1	0	1	83.33
(United States) (Cricket West Indies) 2024	Semi-final	4/20	8	4	3	0	1	57.14
(India) (Sri Lanka) 2026	Qualified							
(Australia) (New Zealand) 2028	TBD							
(England) (Wales) (Republic of Ireland) (Scotland) 2030	Qualified as co-hosts							
Total	2 titles	9/9	56	30	23	0	3	53.57

*The win percentage excludes no results and counts ties as half a win.

==== ICC Champions Trophy ====
Champions Trophy record
Year	Round	Position	GP	W	L	T	NR	Win %
(Bangladesh) 1998	Quarter-final	5/9	1	0	1	0	0	0.00
(Kenya) 2000	Quarter-final	7/11	1	0	1	0	0	0.00
(Sri Lanka) 2002	Pool stage	6/12	2	1	1	0	0	50.00
(England) (Wales) 2004	Runners-up	2/12	4	3	1	0	0	75.00
(India) 2006	Pool stage	7/10	3	1	2	0	0	33.33
(South Africa) 2009	Semi-final	4/8	4	2	2	0	0	50.00
(England) (Wales) 2013	Runners-up	2/8	5	3	2	0	0	60.00
(England) (Wales) 2017	Semi-final	3/8	4	3	1	0	0	75.00
(Pakistan) (United Arab Emirates) 2025	Qualified							
Total	0 titles	8/8	24	13	11	0	0	54.17

*The win percentage excludes no results and counts ties as half a win.

==== Summer Olympics ====
Summer Olympics record
Year	Round	Position	GP	W	L	T	NR	Win %
(France) 1900	Champions	1/2	1	1	0	0	0	100.00
Total	1 title	1/1	1	1	0	0	0	100.00

*The Summer Olympics Gold medal was won by the Devon and Somerset Wanderers representing Great Britain.
*The win percentage excludes no results and counts ties as half a win.

=== Women's team ===
==== ICC Women's Cricket World Cup ====
World Cup record
Year	Round	Position	Played	Won	Lost	Tie	NR
(England) 1973	Champions	1/7	6	5	1	0	0
(India) 1978	Runners-up	2/4	3	2	1	0	0
(New Zealand) 1982	Runners-up	2/5	13	7	4	2	0
(Australia) 1988	Runners-up	2/5	9	6	3	0	0
(England) 1993	Champions	1/8	8	7	1	0	0
(India) 1997	Semi-finals	3/11	7	5	2	0	0
(New Zealand) 2000	Group Stage	5/8	7	3	4	0	0
(South Africa) 2005	Semi-finals	4/8	8	3	3	0	2
(Australia) 2009	Champions	1/8	9	8	1	0	0
(India) 2013	Semi-finals	3/8	8	5	3	0	0
(England) 2017	Champions	1/8	9	8	1	0	0
(New Zealand) 2022	Runners-up	2/8	9	5	4	0	0
(India) 2025							
Total	4 Title	-	96	64	28	2	2

==== ICC Women's T20 World Cup ====
T20 World Cup record
Year	Round	Position	Played	Won	Lost	Tie	NR
(England) 2009	Champions	1/8	5	5	0	0	0
(Cricket West Indies) 2010	Group Stage	5/8	3	1	2	0	0
(Sri Lanka) 2012	Runners-up	2/8	5	4	1	0	0
(Bangladesh) 2014	Runners-up	2/8	6	4	2	0	0
(India) 2016	Group Stage	4/10	5	4	1	0	0
(United Arab Emirates) 2018	Runners-up	2/10	6	3	3	0	0
(Australia) 2020	Semi-finals	4/10	5	3	1	0	1
(South Africa) 2023	Semi-finals	3/10	5	4	1	0	0
(United Arab Emirates) 2024	Group Stage	6/10	4	3	1	0	0
(England) 2026							
Total	1 Title	-	44	31	12	0	1

==== Commonwealth Games ====
Commonwealth Games record
Year	Round	Position	GP	W	L	T	NR
(England) 2022	Medal round	4/8	5	3	2	0	0
Total	0 Title	-	5	3	2	0	0

=== Men's U-19 team ===
==== U-19 World Cup ====
India U19 Cricket World Cup record
Year	Result	Pos	№	Pld	W	L	T	NR
(Australia) 1988	Semi-final	4th	8	8	4	4	0	0
(South Africa) 1998	Champions	1st	16	7	5	2	0	0
(Sri Lanka) 2000	Group Stage	6th	16	6	3	3	0	0
(New Zealand) 2002	Group Stage	7th	16	6	2	4	0	0
(Bangladesh) 2004	Semi-finals	4th	16	7	5	2	0	0
(Sri Lanka) 2006	Semi-finals	4th	16	5	3	2	0	0
(Malaysia) 2008	Quarter-finals	5th	16	6	3	2	0	1
(New Zealand) 2010	Quarter-finals	8th	16	6	3	3	0	0
(Australia) 2012	Quarter-finals	5th	16	6	4	2	0	0
(United Arab Emirates) 2014	Semi-finals	3rd	16	6	4	2	0	0
(Bangladesh) 2016	Quarter-finals	6th	16	6	4	2	0	0
(New Zealand) 2018	Quarter-finals	7th	16	5	3	2	0	0
(South Africa) 2020	Group Stage	9th	16	6	4	2	0	0
(Cricket West Indies) 2022	Runners-up	2nd	16	5	4	1	0	0
(South Africa) 2024	Super 6	6th	16	7	4	3	0	0
Total	1 titles			92	55	36	0	1

=== Women's U-19 team ===
==== Under-19 Women's World Cup ====
England U19 T20 World Cup record
Year	Result	Pos	№	Pld	W	L	T	NR
(South Africa) 2023	Runner-up	2nd	16	7	6	1	0	0
Total	1 title		16	7	6	1	0	0

== Bibliography ==
- Malcolm, Dominic (2013). Globalizing Cricket Codification, Colonization and Contemporary Identities. Bloomsbury USA Academic. ISBN 978-1849665278.

== See also ==
- Sport in England
- Cricket in Wales
- Cricket in Scotland
- Cricket in Ireland
