= Edward Watts =

Edward Watts may refer to:

- Eddie Watts (1912–1982), English cricketer
- Eddie Watts (wrestler) (born 1968), Canadian wrestler
- Edward J. Watts (born 1975), American classical historian and author
- Edward Watts (director), English filmmaker
