= Irving Washington =

English cricketer

- Born: William Arthur Irving Washington; December 11, 1879; Wombwell, Yorkshire, England
- Died: October 20, 1927 (aged 47); Wombwell, Yorkshire, England

William Arthur Irving Washington (11 December 1879 – 20 October 1927) was an English first-class cricketer, who played 44 matches for Yorkshire County Cricket Club between 1900 and 1902. He also appeared for Griqualand West (1904/05), Transvaal (1906/07) and The Players (1902). He also played for the Yorkshire Second XI (1899–1901) and Yorkshire Colts (1902).

Born in Wombwell, Yorkshire, Washington was a left-handed batsman, who scored 1,384 runs at 21.96, in his 48 first-class games, with a best of 100 not out against Surrey, his only century. He held eighteen catches in the field. His nephew, Roy Kilner, played Test cricket for England, whilst another nephew, Norman Kilner, played over 400 first-class matches for Yorkshire and Warwickshire.

Arguably Washington's most famous innings was one of nine not out against the Australians in 1902, as this enabled Yorkshire to reach 50 for 5 wickets in their second innings, and thereby achieve a five-wicket victory.

Washington died in October 1927, in Wombwell.
