= Roy Kilner =

English cricketer

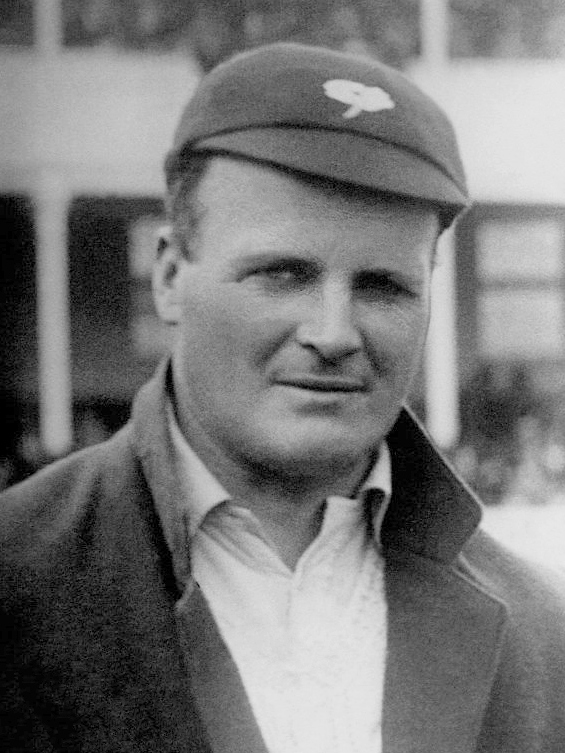
- Roy Kilner in 1925

Personal information
- Full name: Roy Kilner
- Born: 17 October 1890; Wombwell, Yorkshire, England
- Died: 5 April 1928 (aged 37); Kendray, Barnsley, Yorkshire, England
- Batting: Left-handed
- Bowling: Left-arm orthodox spin / Left-arm unorthodox spin

International information
- National side: England
- Test debut (cap 214): 14 June 1924 v South Africa
- Last Test: 27 July 1926 v Australia

Domestic team information
- Years: Team
- 1911–1927: Yorkshire

Career statistics
Competition	Test	First-class
Matches	9	416
Runs scored	233	14,707
Batting average	33.28	30.01
100s/50s	0/2	18/82
Top score	74	206*
Balls bowled	2,368	58,678
Wickets	24	1,003
Bowling average	30.58	18.45
5 wickets in innings	0	48
10 wickets in match	0	10
Best bowling	4/58	8/26
Catches/stumpings	6/0	266/0
- Source: CricketArchive, 23 April 2010

Roy Kilner (17 October 1890 – 5 April 1928) was an English professional cricketer who played nine Test matches for England between 1924 and 1926. An all-rounder, he played for Yorkshire County Cricket Club between 1911 and 1927. In all first-class matches, he scored 14,707 runs at an average of 30.01 and took 1,003 wickets at an average of 18.45. Kilner scored 1,000 runs in a season ten times and took 100 wickets in a season five times. On four occasions, he completed the double: scoring 1,000 runs and taking 100 wickets in the same season, recognised as a sign of a quality all-rounder.

Kilner first played for Yorkshire as a batsman before the First World War, establishing a regular place in the side. After being wounded in the war, he returned in 1919 to a Yorkshire side which was short of bowlers. As a result, Kilner began to practise his bowling to the point where he became highly regarded as a slow left-arm bowler. His aggressive batting and warm personality made him a popular player with both cricketers and spectators. His form brought selection by England in 1924 and a visit to Australia for the Ashes tour of 1924–25. Although the second most successful bowler of the tour, his bowling subsequently declined in effectiveness, and did not trouble batsmen on good pitches. He was selected during the 1926 Ashes but dropped for the final Test. Kilner went on several coaching trips to India during English winters, and on one of these, in 1928, he contracted an illness; on his return to England, he died aged 37. His funeral was attended by over 100,000 people and there was widespread sadness at his death.

== Early life ==
Kilner was born on 17 October 1890 in Wombwell, Barnsley, Yorkshire, England, the second son and one of eleven children of Seth Kilner and Mary Alice Washington. His brother Norman also played cricket, representing Yorkshire and Warwickshire. The Kilners attended Wombwell Parish Church and the boys were members of the Church Lads' Brigade. His father and his uncle, Irving Washington, the former Yorkshire player, encouraged him to play cricket from an early age. He showed enough ability to join the local colliery team, Mitchell Main.

At the age of 14 in 1904, Kilner reached the Mitchell Main first team. Although selected regularly from 1905, Kilner was not particularly successful with the bat. He displayed aggression but often attempted difficult shots and consequently lost his wicket. His bowling was more effective but used infrequently. By 1909 his batting improved; he scored his first century for the team and began to make consistently good scores, attracting the attention of Yorkshire.

== First years at Yorkshire ==
=== Debut for Yorkshire ===
After scoring a second century for Mitchell Main at the start of the 1910 season, Kilner was chosen to play for Yorkshire Second XI. In his first season, he took three wickets and had a batting average of 12.50 but continued to do well for Mitchell Main. For 1911, Yorkshire sent Kilner to play for Harrogate Cricket Club which provided a higher standard of cricket than Mitchell Main: the county had a system whereby promising young players were sent to gain experience in competitive matches for local clubs. Kilner began to record good batting and bowling performances. Although his form for Yorkshire Second XI was more inconsistent, he made his first-class debut for Yorkshire that season against Somerset in the County Championship. He scored 0 and 14 and did not bowl. In a further six matches for Yorkshire in 1911, his highest innings was 18 runs, his average with the bat was just 6.66 in ten innings and he did not take any wickets. For Harrogate, he was more successful, with 519 runs and 28 wickets.

=== Yorkshire regular ===
Kilner made a good start to 1912 for Yorkshire Second XI, scoring centuries in two consecutive games; in the second he also took twelve wickets for 75 runs. These performances, coupled with continued good form for Harrogate, led to Kilner's recall to the Yorkshire first team in June. He replaced the injured all-rounder George Hirst for a match against Nottinghamshire. On the first morning, Kilner was used as the sixth bowler and proved successful; he finished with four wickets for 66 runs. Although failing to score in the first innings, he came in to bat in the second innings with Yorkshire 133 for four, needing 249 for victory. He shared a partnership of 113 for the fifth wicket and scored 83 not out to take Yorkshire to a five wicket win. This performance kept Kilner in the team for the remainder of the season, even after Hirst's return. He played 23 times for Yorkshire. He scored 570 runs at an average of 22.80 and took 16 wickets at an average of 22.12, figures regarded as respectable for a first full season. Yorkshire won the County Championship that season. Apart from one game in the 1913 season, he ceased playing for Harrogate. In his years there, he scored 967 runs, averaging 38.68, and took 71 wickets at an average of less than ten runs per wicket.

In the 1913 season, Kilner scored 1,586 runs at an average of 34.47, which remained his highest seasonal aggregate of runs and placed him third in the Yorkshire batting averages. He also took 18 wickets at 25.22. At the end of May and beginning of June, Kilner took part in century partnerships in four consecutive matches, culminating in his maiden first-class century against Leicestershire. During his innings of 104, he hit 18 fours and shared a partnership of 184 in under two hours with his close friend Major Booth, rescuing Yorkshire from 58 for five and taking the score to 300. Throughout the season, he played several valuable innings when Yorkshire were under pressure. His batting was always adventurous and attacking although he often made uncertain starts to his innings and showed impatience. The strength and variety of the Yorkshire bowling attack meant his left-arm spin was not often required. Even so, Yorkshire dropped to second in the Championship.

An illness during the winter of 1913–14 took its toll on Kilner at the start of the 1914 season. He passed 1,000 runs for the second time but due to his uncertain form, his aggregate of runs and his average both fell. He scored 1,329 runs (average 30.90), placing him fourth in the Yorkshire batting averages. His bowling was rarely used and he took just one wicket. Kilner scored his second first-class century against Gloucestershire late in the season; he made 169 in nearly three and a half hours, hitting 28 fours. Yorkshire fell to fourth in the championship.

== First World War ==
The United Kingdom declared war on Germany on 4 August 1914, while Kilner was playing in that season's Roses Match at Old Trafford. Initially the government requested that cricket should continue, though several cricketers with military obligations, including Yorkshire's captain, Sir Archibald White, were called up immediately. As the fighting started, and casualties began to mount, public opinion turned against the continuation of the season, and Yorkshire's match against Sussex at Hove, which concluded on 1 September, was the last County Championship match until 1919. The newspaper Cricket reported "The men's hearts were barely in the game, and the match was given up as a draw at tea." With the suspension of the championship, Kilner and Major Booth enlisted in the army together, joining the Leeds and Bradford "Pals" in the West Yorkshire Regiment. Kilner trained as a mechanic before being stationed at Colsterdale in North Yorkshire as a corporal. While on leave in November 1914, Kilner married Annie Campbelljohn—the daughter of James Campbelljohn, an engineer—at Wombwell Parish Church; Booth served as best man. During the war, Annie gave birth to the couple's first child, Roy junior. Kilner was posted with his battalion to Egypt but was forced home with an injury. When he recovered, he was sent to the Western Front in France. During the Battle of the Somme, he was wounded shortly before his battalion engaged in the fighting, receiving a shrapnel wound in the wrist; later in the same action, Booth was killed. Kilner recovered in a military hospital near Blackpool before being assigned to Preston Garrison as a mechanic. Kilner suffered a second loss when his brother Bernard was killed at Ypres in 1917.

Having previously played football for Mitchell Main in the winter of 1912–13, Kilner played as a right-back for Preston North End F.C. while posted to Preston during the war. The team won promotion from the Second Division in 1915, and took their place in the First Division when league football resumed in 1919. Sometimes playing under the name of Smith to avoid detection (although it is not certain why he did so), Kilner's first certain appearance for the team was in September 1918. It is unclear how often he represented the club.

== First-class career after the war ==
=== From batsman to bowler ===
When cricket resumed after the war in 1919, County Championship matches were reduced from three days to two in a one-season experiment. Following the deaths of Booth in the war and Alonzo Drake from illness, as well as the decline in the bowling of the aging George Hirst, Yorkshire lacked an effective attack. Subsequently, Kilner was asked to deliver more overs, although not to the extent of a main bowler. He took 45 wickets, more than his entire first-class wicket aggregate before the war, at an average of 18.12. This placed him third in the Yorkshire averages. With the bat he scored three centuries and reached 1,135 runs at 29.10. His performances earned him a place in the Gentlemen v Players match at the end of season during the Scarborough Festival, although he neither took a wicket nor scored. Kilner's brother Norman also played for Yorkshire in 1919, although he was ultimately unable to secure a permanent place in the team.

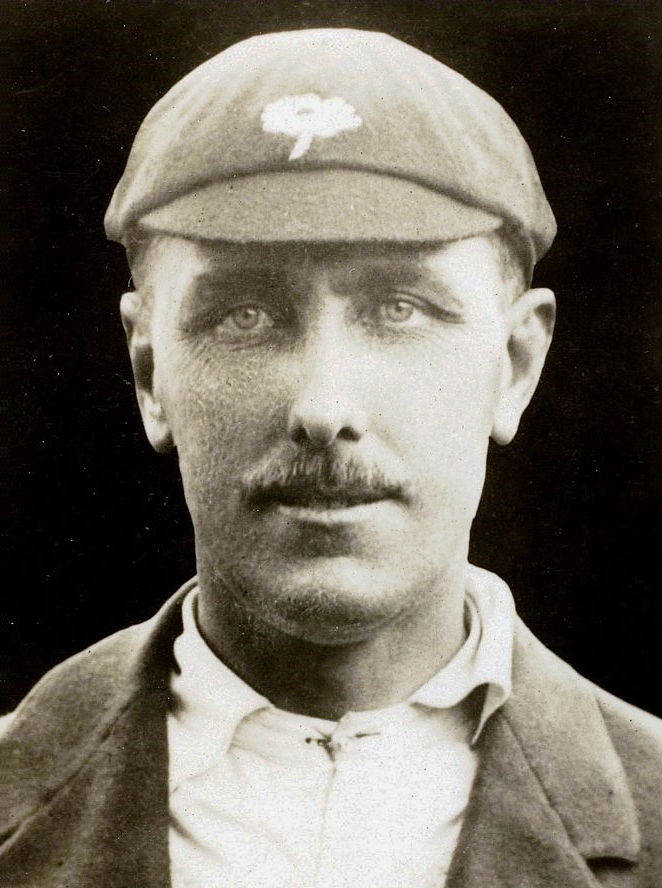
Wilfred Rhodes, pictured c. 1920, encouraged Kilner to develop his bowling.

Kilner began the 1920 season with an innings of 206 not out in his first match, against Derbyshire, and the effort remained the highest score of his career. He batted for four hours, hitting 24 fours and two sixes. He could have been caught when he had scored around fifty, but a local newspaper described the innings as brilliant, his driving and pulling being particularly effective. Kilner appeared in one representative match: at the end-of-season Scarborough Festival, he played for CI Thornton's XI against the Marylebone Cricket Club (MCC) side which visited Australia in the winter—at the time, the MCC administered English cricket, and the England team toured under its name. In total, he scored 1,316 runs at an average of 37.09 with two more centuries, placing him second in the Yorkshire averages. With the ball, he took 27 wickets but his average of 25.33 was relatively high. The county finished fourth in the Championship as Middlesex were crowned winners. Critics believed Kilner should have bowled more frequently, an opinion shared by Wilfred Rhodes, Yorkshire's main slow left-arm spinner. Conscious of his increasing age, the 42-year-old Rhodes wanted support with the bowling workload; he considered Kilner the best option and encouraged him to improve his left-arm spin. Consequently, during the winter, Kilner practised bowling in the yard of the Wombwell hotel where his father was landlord. Around the same time he celebrated the birth of his second son, named Major after Major Booth.

Kilner's bowling had greater success in 1921, helping Yorkshire to rise to third in the Championship. Used more regularly, he took 61 wickets (average 18.80), including his first five-wicket hauls in an innings, against Warwickshire and Nottinghamshire. He scored 1,137 runs at an average of 27.73. He made centuries in the two matches against Northamptonshire, sharing big partnerships in both games: 276 with Rhodes in the first and 299 with Percy Holmes in the second. His overall performance left him sixth in the Yorkshire batting averages, and fourth in the bowling averages. (Note: The placings for Yorkshire bowling averages include only bowlers who took ten wickets or more and batsmen who played ten innings.) Through the winter, he continued to develop his bowling.

=== Established all-rounder ===
By 1922, Kilner's bowling had improved to the point where he passed 100 wickets in the season for the first time, taking 122 at an average of 14.72, helping Yorkshire to win the County Championship. Wisden recognised this was the first season when he was a front-line bowler, "[leaving] his previous form far behind." In the first five games of the campaign, he took 21 wickets for 142 runs. In the match against Essex, he claimed ten wickets in a match for the first time, taking eleven for 51 runs. Against Hampshire, he took ten wickets for 90 runs, including six for 13 in the second innings as Hampshire were bowled out for 44. At the same time, he maintained his batting form, having a similar record to the previous season. He scored 1,198 runs at 27.22 and scored two centuries. This meant he completed the double—regarded as the sign of a quality all-round cricketer—for the first time. Kilner was fifth in the Yorkshire batting averages and fourth in the bowling averages. At the end of the season, he was again selected for CI Thornton's XI, as well as in two games at Eastbourne. Over the English winter, Kilner accepted a job coaching for the Maharaja of Patiala in India. He played in several first-class matches, and enjoyed himself enough to return the following winter.

Statistically, Kilner's peak as a bowler came in the 1923 season, when he took 158 wickets at an average of 12.90 and finished second in the Yorkshire averages. With the bat, he failed to score a hundred for the first time since 1912, but still made 1,401 runs at 34.17 and including nine scores over fifty. This placed him third in the Yorkshire batting averages, his contributions helping his team to retain the County Championship. He made a very effective start to the season, taking 27 wickets in the first four matches for just 157 runs, including the best figures of his career, eight for 26 against Glamorgan, and six for 14 against Middlesex. Later that season against Surrey, he performed what was regarded by Wisden as one of his best bowling feats. Surrey needed 184 runs to win and seemed certain winners when they had scored 127 for two. After Emmott Robinson took a wicket, Kilner took the last five for only 15 runs in a match-winning performance. He finished with bowling figures of six for 22 and took ten wickets in the match. He had been under the impression that Surrey had only needed seven runs (rather than the 27 they required) to win at the end, and his teammates remembered he was pale with effort and concentration. In the same season, Kilner was picked for the Gentlemen v Players match at Lord's Cricket Ground, the most prestigious such fixture at the time, where he scored eight in his only innings and took three wickets. Wisden commented that he seemed certain to be picked for the England Test match side shortly (there were no Tests played that summer). He took a step towards this when he was selected for a Test trial match, scoring 26 and 11 not out, but only bowling 18 overs in the match to take two wickets. He also made another appearance for the Players, this time at Scarborough. His performances in the season earned him selection as one of Wisden's Bowlers of the Year.

== Test match career ==
=== Test debut ===
After another winter coaching in India and practising his bowling, Kilner took 145 first-class wickets at 13.28 during the 1924 English summer, placing him second in the national averages behind his teammate George Macaulay. His batting suffered a decline; he scored 731 runs at 20.88, the lowest aggregate of his career and his first sub-1,000 total since 1912. Kilner took 33 wickets in the first six matches of the season, and his form earned selection for a Test trial match. In this game, he took three for 49 in the first innings and a further wicket in the second but only scored 20 runs in two innings. After 19 wickets in his next three matches, including seven in the match against the South African touring side, he was awarded a place in the England team for the first Test. In his maiden Test, he scored 59 out of a large total, batting at number seven. South Africa were dismissed for 30 runs in the first innings before Kilner had an opportunity to bowl. In the second innings, he delivered 22 overs without taking a wicket and commentators were not impressed by his bowling. The selectors left Kilner out of the next two Tests, all-rounder J. W. Hearne taking his place, but he played in the Gentlemen v Players match at Lord's. He scored a rapid 113—his only century of the season—for the Players. By lunch on the last day, the Gentlemen had followed-on but were well placed to secure a draw with the score at 112 for three. Kilner settled the match by taking quick wickets and ending the innings with figures of six for 20 as the Players won by an innings. Kilner was recalled for Hearne in the fourth Test, but rain prevented all play after the first day. He bowled 12 wicketless overs, meaning he had not dismissed anyone in his first two Tests and he did not play in the last Test as Hearne returned. For Yorkshire, he had a more successful time, three times taking ten wickets in a match, including twelve for 55 in the final championship match of the season, which Yorkshire had to win to have a chance of winning the title. Yorkshire's opponents, Sussex, were bowled out twice for less than 100, and when other results went Yorkshire's way, the club were crowned champions for the third successive year. Kilner was chosen for the Players again in an end of season match at Scarborough. Although his poor batting meant his form as an all-rounder was disappointing, he had a very good season as a bowler. Nevertheless, his selection to tour Australia that winter with the MCC team surprised commentators.

=== Tour of Australia ===
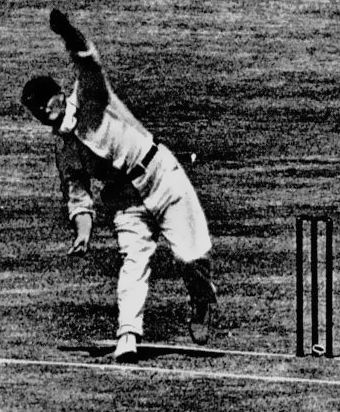
Kilner bowling in the fifth Test at Sydney, 1924–25

Playing for MCC under the captaincy of Arthur Gilligan, Kilner made 103 against Western Australia on his maiden first-class appearance in Australia. He continued to show good all-round form in the less important, non first-class matches, but in first-class matches leading up to the Tests he was less successful. Kilner passed fifty runs just once after his century and with the ball took one wicket in 81 overs during seven innings. He did not play in the first two Test matches, both of which were lost by England, but was selected for the third when the selectors altered the bowling attack. During the match, a series of injuries to colleagues left Kilner with a heavy workload. Australia batted first and scored 489, a total which looked unlikely when they lost three wickets for 22 and later six wickets for 119. England's pace bowlers, Gilligan and Maurice Tate, had to leave the field injured, allowing Australia to recover; later the spinner Tich Freeman hurt his wrist and could not bowl. The only fit front-line bowlers remaining were Kilner and Frank Woolley. England fielded for nearly nine hours, and Kilner bowled 56 eight-ball overs to take four for 127, his first wicket in Test matches being Arthur Richardson. Given the injuries, Gilligan later said Kilner gave "a truly great performance". England could not match Australia's total, scoring only 365, but when the hosts batted again, rain fell and affected the pitch, making it responsive to spin bowling. Australia lost their last seven wickets for 39 runs in an hour and Kilner took four for 14 in his final spell of bowling to end with four for 51. Needing 375 to win, Kilner scored 24 but England fell just short to lose by 11 runs. Consequently, Australia took an unbeatable 3–0 series lead. Between the third and fourth matches in the series, Kilner recorded good bowling performances, with five for 35 against Tasmania and match figures of ten for 66 against Victoria, and kept his place for the final two Tests.

In the fourth Test, which England won comfortably, Kilner scored 79, his highest Test score, adding 133 with Dodger Whysall, the largest partnership of the match. When Australia batted, Kilner took five wickets in the match and stood out as one of the best bowlers. In the final Test, Kilner took four for 97 in Australia's first innings, but could not prevent the home team's fourth victory of the series. Kilner finished the series with 129 runs and averaged 29.80, batting mainly at number eight in the order, and Wisden noted he scored runs when they were needed. In the Tests, he captured 17 wickets at an average of 23.47. Wisden noted that no-one but Kilner could take wickets to support Tate, the most successful bowler. Apart from these two, no other bowler could manage more than 11 wickets and the other main bowlers averaged around 50. In all first-class matches, Kilner scored 488 runs at 24.88 and took 40 wickets at 25.17.

== Final seasons ==
=== Decline as a bowler ===
During 1925, Kilner was awarded a benefit match and had an improved batting record for the season but critics began to notice a decline in his bowling. He was effective on pitches which favoured spin bowlers, but not on the flatter pitches prevalent in the dry summer of 1925. Cricket journals, such as The Cricketer, criticised his tendency to bowl leg theory—a tactic regarded as negative and overly defensive—when confronted with batting-friendly conditions. He took 131 wickets at 17.92, finishing second in the Yorkshire averages and helping his team to their fourth successive County Championship. He scored 1,068 runs at an average of 30.51 with two centuries. This gave him the third double of his career. Kilner's popularity with the crowds peaked in 1925, when over three days, 71,000 people attended his benefit match against Middlesex. It raised £4,106 (the equivalent of around £175,000 in 2008), to set a new record for benefit proceeds. There were no Test matches in 1925, but Kilner was once again selected for the Gentlemen v Players match at Lord's, scoring 59 in his only innings and taking five wickets in the match, as well as some end of season matches for the MCC's team from the previous winter.

In the winter of 1925–26, Kilner was selected for the MCC tour of the West Indies, during which no Test matches were played. It was not personally successful for him and he recorded few effective performances. He scored 249 runs in first-class matches at 22.63, with just one score over fifty, and took 34 wickets at 29.50.

Yorkshire's run of success ended in 1926 as fierce rivals Lancashire relegated them into second place. Kilner had some successful matches in the season and achieved at a consistent level, but his performance showed signs of deteriorating. He scored 1,187 runs at 37.09, the highest seasonal average of his career. He completed the double for the fourth and final time by taking 107 wickets, but his bowling average of 22.52 was his worst since 1920, before he became a regular bowler. He finished sixth in the Yorkshire batting and third in the bowling averages. He played for the Players for the final time at Lord's, scoring 72, but failed to take a wicket. His final first-class century came against Middlesex, when he compiled 150 out of a total of 415, dominating the scoring while he was at the crease. During the summer's Ashes series, he was selected for the first four Tests. He only batted twice with a highest score of 36. With the ball, he took seven wickets at 39.42, but the editor of Wisden criticised much of the English bowling; he described Kilner's only notable achievement as quickly ending Australia's innings in the second Test at Lord's. For the final Test, Kilner was dropped in favour of 48-year-old Wilfred Rhodes. According to the chairman of selectors, Pelham Warner, Rhodes was recalled because of the lack of an effective alternative left-arm spinner. Rhodes had a successful match and England defeated Australia to win the Ashes for the first time since 1912, but Kilner had played his last Test. In nine Tests, he scored 233 runs at an average of 33.28 and took 24 wickets at 30.58.

Over the winter of 1926–27, Kilner declined an invitation to tour India by the MCC. The 1927 season, which proved to be Kilner's last, was his least effective for several years and a disappointing summer for Yorkshire. The county fell to third in the Championship behind Lancashire and Nottinghamshire. He failed to achieve a century, scoring 1,004 runs (average 33.46), and did not reach 100 wickets for the first time since 1921, taking just 86 wickets at an average of 23.68. Wisden said his bowling had lost its effectiveness and was no longer dangerous even when the pitch was helpful to spinners. In the Yorkshire averages, he finished fifth in both batting and bowling. In Kilner's final County Championship match, he scored 91 not out and took eight wickets, including five for 21 in the second innings, helping Yorkshire to a nine wicket victory. In his final first-class match, for Yorkshire against MCC, Kilner scored an unbeaten 51 to guide Yorkshire to an eight wicket win. He ended his first-class career with 14,707 runs at an average of 30.01 and 1,003 wickets at an average of 18.45.

=== Death ===
The Maharaja of Patiala again invited Kilner to play and coach in India in the winter of 1927–28. Kilner's sister Mollie later said he was very reluctant to take up the invitation and hesitated before accepting. The trip started badly when Kilner's uncle, Irving Washington, died the day after he departed, and several of Kilner's actions suggest this triggered some form of depression. Even so, Kilner recorded several large scores, including an unbeaten 283 in one (non first-class) match. Near the end of trip, he began to suffer from a fever. His Yorkshire teammates, Arthur Dolphin and Maurice Leyland, who were also in India, believed he became unwell after eating oysters, but it is not certain how or when Kilner became ill. He began to have shivering attacks and perspiration while travelling from Marseilles on the way home. It was obvious he was seriously ill when he arrived in Southampton; a cricketing engagement was cancelled and he was confined to bed. He refused treatment in Southampton, wishing to return to his family, and asking for his wife. Arriving in Wombwell on 27 March 1928, he was examined by his doctor and taken home. Subsequently, his condition deteriorated and he was taken to Kendray Fever Hospital, near Barnsley. Although it was thought he had passed the worst, his condition became critical in the first few days of April. On 5 April 1928, Kilner died from enteric fever in the presence of his wife.

The town of Wombwell expressed enormous sympathy and tributes came from around the world. When Kilner's funeral took place on 10 April, the streets were packed with mourners. Many came from outside the town, and according to contemporary estimates 100,000 people were present to pay tribute to Kilner; there may have been more. Over a thousand people were at the cemetery for the burial, and Yorkshire cricketers carried the coffin. Two years later, the Australian team which toured England in 1930 visited Kilner's grave in Wombwell to lay a wreath. The rector at the funeral said in his tribute: "A Yorkshire wicket has fallen and one of Yorkshire's best men is out; and we lament his loss; not merely because it is the loss of a great cricketer, but because it is the loss of such a cricketer as Roy Kilner was."

== Style and personality ==
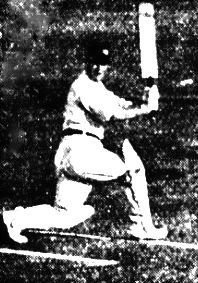
Kilner batting in the fifth Test at Sydney, 1924–25

Kilner first came into the Yorkshire side as a batsman. He was considered a good, reliable batsman when he began, although his style was regarded by Yorkshire critics as unorthodox to the point where they disapproved of some of his unusual, eccentric shots. For Yorkshire, he appeared high in the order, but batted between number seven and number nine for England. If the circumstances of the game demanded it, he was able to play slowly and defensively and restrain his naturally aggressive style. He was particularly effective while playing the drive and pull shot. For most of his career, his effectiveness as a batsman was not compromised by his improvement and increasing workload as a bowler.

In terms of bowling, Kilner was an effective performer on rain affected pitches. His accuracy also enabled him to bowl on good pitches without the batsmen being able to score too many runs. In 1923, journalist Alfred Pullin said Kilner spun the ball more than any other English bowler. He noted, as did Wisden, how Kilner often bowled over the wicket, meaning he bowled from the right hand side of the wickets, unusual for a left-arm spinner in this period. This established a contrast with his fellow left-arm spinner, Wilfred Rhodes, and increased their effectiveness. Furthermore, it allowed him to surprise batsmen with a different delivery, such as one which did not turn. Kilner's Wisden portrait also credited him with the gift of imagination, describing how he always tried to think of new ways to beat and dismiss batsmen. He would experiment with his bowling, for example altering his pace slightly, if conditions were unfavourable towards bowlers. Kilner delivered left-arm wrist spin at times, constantly practising it in the cricket nets. His brother Norman believed Roy was the person who coined the term "chinaman" to describe such a style, although other players have also claimed to originate the phrase.

At a time when the Yorkshire team was successful but exhibited a grim and determined attitude, Kilner was very popular with spectators. They liked him for his cheerfulness and desire to entertain, an attitude not shared by all of his teammates. He had many friends in the game at a time when Yorkshire were not always welcome in other counties due to their on-field attitude. When he was chosen as a Bowler of the Year in 1924, Wisden remarked that he was devoted to the game, possessed a cheery temperament and stood out among players for his personality, while his obituary described him as modest and generous. His Times obituary described him as "not only a notable exponent of the game, but a man of rare charm. Few modern professionals commanded such a measure of esteem and kindly regard from his own immediate colleagues and his opponents in the cricket field as did Roy Kilner".

Kilner was a favourite of cricket writer Neville Cardus, who attributed several sayings to him in his prose. For example, Cardus described Kilner as saying about Yorkshire and Lancashire matches at the time: "What we want is no umpires and fair cheating all round", and "We say good morning and after that all we say is 'Howzat?'" Also, when asked about contemporary problems in the game, in particular the negative attitude of some teams, he replied the game was fine, it was "t'crowd that wants educating up to it."

== Bibliography ==
- Hodgson, Derek (1989). The Official History of Yorkshire County Cricket Club. Ramsbury, Marlborough, Wiltshire: The Crowood Press. ISBN 1-85223-274-9.
- Pope, Mick (1990). The Laughing Cricketer of Wombwell. London: Darf Publishers. ISBN 1-85077-219-3.
- Woodhouse, Anthony (1989). The History of Yorkshire County Cricket Club. London: Christopher Helm. ISBN 0-7470-3408-7.
