= Joseph Mayer (cricketer) =

English cricketer

Cricket information
- Batting: Right-handed
- Bowling: Right-arm fast-medium

Career statistics
Competition	First-class
Matches	333
Runs scored	2,839
Batting average	9.65
100s/50s	0/3
Top score	74*
Balls bowled	61,325
Wickets	1,144
Bowling average	22.20
5 wickets in innings	71
10 wickets in match	9
Best bowling	8/62
Catches/stumpings	184/–
- Source: CricketArchive, 12 April 2023

Joseph Herbert Mayer (2 March 1902 – 6 September 1981) was an English first-class cricketer who played with Warwickshire.

A right-arm fast medium bowler, Mayer took 1142 wickets for Warwickshire which has been bettered by only three players. He had his best season in 1929 when he took 126 wickets at 22.35 and followed it up with 108 the following season.
