= Frank Booth (cricketer) =

English cricketer (1907–1980)

Frank Stanley Booth (12 February 1907 – 21 January 1980) was an English cricketer who played first-class cricket for Lancashire between 1927 and 1937. Predominantly a fast bowler he took 457 wickets for the club including 101 during the 1934 English season in which the county won the County Championship.
