= Victor Evans =

English cricketer (1912–1975)

Personal information
- Full name: Victor James Evans
- Born: 4 March 1912; Woodford, Essex, England
- Died: 28 March 1975 (aged 63); Barking, Greater London, England
- Batting: Right-handed
- Bowling: Right-arm off-break/medium pace
- Role: Bowler

Domestic team information
- Years: Team
- 1932–1937: Essex

Career statistics
Competition	FC
Matches	62
Runs scored	469
Batting average	7.94
100s/50s	–/–
Top score	23*
Balls bowled	7828
Wickets	129
Bowling average	29.79
5 wickets in innings	5
10 wickets in match	1
Best bowling	6/47
Catches/stumpings	12/–
- Source: Cricinfo, 20 July 2013

Victor James Evans (4 March 1912 – 28 March 1975) was an English cricketer. He played for Essex between 1932 and 1937 as a tail-end batsman and off-break bowler.
