= Maurice Nichol =

English cricketer (1904–1934)

Personal information
- Born: 10 September 1904; Hetton-le-Hole, County Durham, England
- Died: 21 May 1934 (aged 29); Chelmsford, Essex, England
- Batting: Right-handed
- Bowling: Right-arm googly

Domestic team information
- Years: Team
- 1928–1934: Worcestershire

Career statistics
| Competition | First-class |
|---|---|
| Matches | 136 |
| Runs scored | 7,484 |
| Batting average | 34.33 |
| 100s/50s | 17/38 |
| Top score | 262* |
| Balls bowled | 1,858 |
| Wickets | 21 |
| Bowling average | 61.00 |
| 5 wickets in innings | 0 |
| 10 wickets in match | 0 |
| Best bowling | 2/6 |
| Catches/stumpings | 64/– |
- Source: CricketArchive, 3 August 2008

Maurice Nichol (10 September 1904 – 21 May 1934) was an English first-class cricketer who played 136 matches in the late 1920s and early 1930s. Other than one appearance for the Players in 1931, all his games were for Worcestershire.

Before beginning his first-class career, Nichol had played at minor counties level for Durham. He also had a trial for Surrey, but in 1928 (having not yet qualified to play in the County Championship) he made his first-class debut for Worcestershire against the touring West Indians at Worcester. Nichol achieved the feat of a hundred on debut by hitting 104, sharing in a stand of 207 with Harold Gibbons.

From 1929 onward, Nichol could play regularly for his county, and in that first full year he managed over 1,400 runs including two centuries and eight fifties. However, 1930 was to prove a more successful season: over the course of the summer he hit five hundreds and seven fifties, including what was to remain the highest score of his career, an unbeaten 262 against Hampshire at Dean Park, Bournemouth.

By 1931 there was talk that he might become good enough to play for England, and indeed he was twelfth man at the Lord's Test against New Zealand that summer, although he never actually gained a Test cap. He did, however, appear for the Players—also at Lord's—though he failed, making just 4 in his only innings. Although he made more than 1,300 runs in 1931, he struck only one century, and that winter he was struck down with pneumonia and was in hospital for several weeks. Although he returned to play in the 1932 season, his form was (perhaps understandably) poor, and he made only five half-centuries and well under 800 runs in the summer.

1933 was another matter entirely, and proved to be Nichol's best. He hit eight hundreds and 11 fifties, and passed 2,000 runs for the season for the only time, finishing with 2,154 at an average of nearly 44. After a string of frustrations in August, when he repeatedly got a start only to be dismissed before making a really large score, he ended the summer in splendid style, scoring centuries in his last three innings. The sequence began with 116 against Hampshire, and this was followed by 165 not out versus Glamorgan. Finally, he hit 154 against Yorkshire. 1933 was also the only year in which Nichol's bowling counted for anything much: he took 16 of his 21 wickets that season bowling googlies.

The 1934 season began rather poorly for Nichol, and after four matches and eight innings he had totaled only 57 runs. He was not to get the chance to make amends: on the second day of the game against Essex at Chelmsford he was found dead in his bed in the Saracen's Head Hotel. His death was discovered by a chambermaid of the hotel at nine in the morning. Nichol had played golf on the previous day (which, being a Sunday, was a rest day) and engaged in wrestling with fellow players till about midnight.

On the next day, the players wore black armbands. Before the start of play, the teams assembled in the ground. The players and the crowd stood bareheaded and in silence for two minutes before the match resumed at 11:30. Five Durham cricketers acted as his pall-bearers. At the inquest his death was put down to heart disease, following double pneumonia two years earlier. A post-mortem examination disclosed an abnormally large heart that the doctor said made it almost unbelievable that Nichol lived such a long active life. Nichol was engaged to be married to Dorothy Ayers.
