= Ben Lilley =

English cricketer (1894–1950)

Personal information
- Born: 11 February 1894; Kimberley, Nottinghamshire, England
- Died: 4 August 1950 (aged 56); Forest Fields, Nottingham, Nottinghamshire, England
- Batting: Right-handed
- Role: Wicketkeeper

Career statistics
Competition	First-class
Matches	373
Runs scored	10,496
Batting average	24.18
100s/50s	7/43
Top score	124
Balls bowled	24
Wickets	0
Bowling average	–
5 wickets in innings	–
10 wickets in match	–
Best bowling	–
Catches/stumpings	657/132
- Source: Cricinfo, 27 December 2018

Ben Lilley (11 February 1894 – 4 August 1950) was an English first-class cricketer active from 1921 to 1937, who played for Nottinghamshire. He was born in Kimberley, Nottinghamshire and died in Nottingham. He played in 373 first-class matches as a right-handed batsman, scoring 10,496 runs with a highest score of 124, one of seven first-class centuries; and as a wicketkeeper, holding 657 catches and completing 133 stumpings.
