= County Cricket Council =

The County Cricket Council was a short lived body intended to regulate county cricket in England. It existed from 1887 to 1890.

The council was the brain-child of Lord Harris. In November 1886 he had sent a letter to the County Secretaries asking the question as to whether the existing two year qualification rule should be reduced to one year. Under this rule players who changed counties generally had to serve a two-year residence qualification in their new county during which they were unable to play inter-county matches for either county. The proposal was defeated at the annual Secretary's meeting in December 1886, but at the same meeting it was agreed that a committee be set up to consider the rules of county cricket generally. At a meeting in July 1887, at which the report of the committee was considered, it was agreed that a County Cricket Council be formed. It was further agreed that the existing committee frame the by-laws of the new Council.

The first meeting on the council was on 5 December 1887 at which Lord Harris was elected chairman. Nothing specific was agreed at this meeting but at a further meeting on 8 February 1888 a change to the hours of play was agreed, as was a proposal regarding a change in the lbw law. Since the Marylebone Cricket Club (MCC) decided the laws this was no more than a suggestion. A proposal abolishing boundaries in favour of all hits run out was defeated.

At the December 1888 meeting a number of proposals relating to the qualification rules were considered but were not carried.

At the December 1889 meeting a proposal by Durham regarding the classification of the counties and a system of promotion and relegation was considered. A committee was set up to consider the issues. The committee proposed three tiers of counties; the existing 8 first class counties, 8 second-class counties and a further 8 third-class counties. It proposed a system of promotion and relegation involving the bottom team of one division playing the top team in the lower division. They would play each other home and away in the following season, the results determining whether the two changed places. Any change would take place in the following season, promotion would therefore take two years.

These proposals were considered at the fourth annual meeting of the Council in December 1890. They were not well received. Eventually a vote was taken on whether The Cricket Council itself should be suspended sine die. The motion was passed on the casting vote of the chairman, Mr M.J. Ellison, and The Cricket Council effectively ceased to exist. "This utterly unexpected result fairly took those present by surprise, and they dispersed hurriedly - a most undignified ending to what we are compelled to describe as a most unbusinesslike meeting."

On the following day, 9 December 1890, the county secretaries met to decide the fixtures for 1891. Since the council had collapsed and no proposal had been passed the counties arranged their fixtures on the old basis of arranging "home and home" matches against whichever counties they wished. "The most noticeable feature ... is the encouragement given to Somersetshire by the chief county clubs. Middlesex played the western shire last summer, but Kent, Surrey, Yorkshire, Gloucestershire and Lancashire will next summer test the merits of the eleven, which showed such good all round cricket, under Mr. H.T. Hewett's command, last year." By arranging these 12 matches against first-class counties Somerset became a de facto first-class county without any proposal or vote to that effect.

== Bibliography ==
Wynne-Thomas, Peter. County Cricket Council in The Cricket Statistician No. 66 (Summer 1989). pp. 43–48.
