= Norman Kilner =

English cricketer

Norman Kilner (21 July 1895 – 28 April 1979) was an English first-class cricketer, who played 69 matches for Yorkshire County Cricket Club from 1919 to 1923, and 330 matches for Warwickshire from 1924 to 1937. He also appeared in first-class cricket for The Players (1924–1928), the North of England (1928) and Sir L Parkinson's XI (1933).

Born in Low Valley, Wombwell, Yorkshire, England, Kilner was a tough, professional right-handed batsman who scored 1,253 runs for Yorkshire at 18.98, with two centuries to his name. He fared better after his move to Edgbaston, scoring 16,075 runs for Warwickshire at 31.89. Overall, in 403 first-class matches, he scored 17,522 runs at 30.36, with 25 centuries and a best score of 228 at New Road, Worcester in 1935, during which he scored a hundred before lunch. A fine fielder, he took 184 catches, and one wicket for 83 runs with his eccentric bowling. He once bowled three balls of an over right-handed, and three balls of it with his left.

His brother, Roy Kilner played Test cricket for England while his nephew, Irving Washington, also played for Yorkshire as a left-handed bat. Kilner was a familiar figure at Edgbaston after his retirement, often commenting on the match in his broad Yorkshire accent, in company with Tiger Smith.

Kilner died in April 1979 in Alum Rock, Birmingham, Warwickshire, aged 83.
