= Tom Richmond (cricketer) =

English cricketer

Cricket information
- Batting: Right-handed
- Bowling: Legbreak googly

International information
- National side: England
- Only Test: 28 May 1921 v Australia

Career statistics
Competition	Test	First-class
Matches	1	252
Runs scored	6	1,644
Batting average	3.00	9.96
100s/50s	0/0	0/2
Top score	4	70
Balls bowled	114	48,048
Wickets	2	1,176
Bowling average	43.00	21.22
5 wickets in innings	0	90
10 wickets in match	0	19
Best bowling	2/69	9/21
Catches/stumpings	0/–	39/–
- Source: CricInfo, 6 November 2022

Thomas Leonard "Tich" Richmond (23 June 1890 – 29 December 1957) was a cricketer who played for Nottinghamshire and England.

A small and somewhat rotund leg-break and googly bowler, Richmond played a few matches for Nottinghamshire before the First World War, but came to the fore in the years after it, taking 100 wickets and more every season from 1920 to 1926. His best year was 1922 when he took 169 wickets, then a Nottinghamshire record, later overtaken by Bruce Dooland. His career then faded rather fast, and he dropped out of the county side after 1928.

Richmond's one Test match was on his home ground of Trent Bridge against the all-conquering Australian cricket team of 1921 led by Warwick Armstrong. He scored six runs in two innings and took two wickets for 86 runs, but was never chosen again.

Richmond's batting was rarely of any account, and, like his fielding, suffered as he got older and stouter. But in 1922, against Derbyshire at Worksop, he scored 70 in 65 minutes, putting on 140 for the tenth wicket with Sam Staples.
