= Jack Buckingham =

English cricketer

John Buckingham
Personal information
- Full name: John Buckingham
- Born: 21 January 1903; Grimethorpe, Yorkshire, England
- Died: 25 January 1987 (aged 84); Moseley, Birmingham, England
- Batting: Right-handed
- Role: Wicketkeeper

Domestic team information
- Years: Team
- 1933–39: Warwickshire
- First-class debut: 9 August 1933 Warwickshire v West Indians
- Last First-class: 31 August 1939 Warwickshire v Middlesex

Career statistics
Competition	FC
Matches	93
Runs scored	2840
Batting average	23.86
100s/50s	3/10
Top score	137*
Catches/stumpings	132/92
- Source: CricketArchive, 15 August 2015

John Buckingham (21 January 1903 – 25 January 1987) was an English cricketer who played first-class cricket for Warwickshire between 1933 and 1939. He was born at Grimethorpe, Yorkshire and died at Moseley, Birmingham.

An itinerant semi-professional footballer, Buckingham played for Wellington Town in the early 1930s and turned out in second eleven matches for Warwickshire, as a lower-order right-handed batsman and wicketkeeper, from 1931. He made his first-class debut in 1933 in a match against the West Indians, scoring two runs and making two stumpings. In 1934, Warwickshire's regular wicketkeeper, Jack Smart, was injured in mid-June; Buckingham kept wicket for the rest of the season "and revealed himself as more than a useful bat", according to the 1935 edition of Wisden Cricketers' Almanack. In addition to 24 catches and 17 stumpings, Buckingham made 454 runs at an average of 23.89 in 1934.

Despite this success, Buckingham did not retain his place when Smart, at the age of 44, was fit to resume in 1935, and in that season and the next he played in only a few matches. Smart retired, however, at the end of the 1936 season and Buckingham was then from the start of the 1937 season Warwickshire's regular wicketkeeper up to the Second World War. His wicketkeeping style, according to an obituary in Wisden, was "brilliant rather than consistent" and he was "apt to snatch" at the ball. But his pugnacious batting was an asset as well: "Never a sound or orthodox player, he had plenty of strokes and hit the ball astonishingly hard for so small a man," Wisden's obituary noted. In 1937 he hit 109, the only century in a Warwickshire total of 518, in the match against Gloucestershire at Gloucester. In 1938, he scored 1054 runs at an average of 31.00 to finish third in the Warwickshire batting, behind Test players Bob Wyatt and Tom Dollery but ahead of established batsmen such as Alfred Croom and Reg Santall, and for much of the season he batted at No 3. The runs included two centuries, the higher of which was an innings of 137 not out against the weak Northamptonshire side. The more sensational innings, however, came in the match against Derbyshire where Warwickshire, set 311 to win the match, had slumped to 39 for five wickets when Buckingham came in to join Dollery: Buckingham scored 124 in just over 150 minutes and the pair put on a then county record sixth wicket partnership of 220, and Warwickshire won by four wickets.

Buckingham's first-class cricket career ended with the outbreak of the Second World War, and he did not resume when cricket restarted in 1946. During the war, he played a lot of cricket for Coventry Cricket Club and for non-first-class Warwickshire teams. From 1953 to 1969, he acted as an umpire in Minor Counties and Second Eleven Championship matches.
