= Eddie Watts =

English cricketer

Cricket information
- Batting: Right-handed
- Bowling: Right-arm fast-medium

Career statistics
Competition	First-class
Matches	244
Runs scored	6,158
Batting average	21.38
100s/50s	2/27
Top score	123
Balls bowled	37,355
Wickets	729
Bowling average	26.06
5 wickets in innings	24
10 wickets in match	2
Best bowling	10/67
Catches/stumpings	155/–
- Source: CricketArchive, 8 November 2022

Edward Alfred Watts (1 August 1912 – 3 May 1982) was an English cricketer. He was born in Peckham, London.

A right-arm fast-medium bowler and a useful right-handed batsman, he played for Surrey from 1933 to 1949. Despite losing some of what might have been his best years to World War II, he took 729 first-class wickets at 26.06, with best innings figures of 10/67 in the second innings against Warwickshire at Edgbaston in 1939. He scored 6158 runs at 21.38, including two centuries. His highest score of 123 was made against a powerful Yorkshire attack at Bradford in 1934. The innings included four 6s and fourteen 4s and took under two hours, as did his only other century.

He was the brother-in-law of Alf Gover, with whom he often opened the Surrey bowling. After his cricket career, he ran a sports shop. He died in Cheam, Surrey at age 69.
