= Tom Goddard =

English cricketer (1900-1966)

Personal information
- Born: 1 October 1900; Gloucester, England
- Died: 22 May 1966 (aged 65)
- Batting: Right-handed
- Bowling: Right-arm offbreak

International information
- National side: England
- Test debut: 25 July 1930 v Australia
- Last Test: 19 August 1939 v West Indies

Domestic team information
- Years: Team
- 1922–1952: Gloucestershire

Career statistics
Competition	Test	First-class
Matches	8	593
Runs scored	13	5,234
Batting average	6.50	9.37
100s/50s	0/0	0/4
Top score	8	71
Balls bowled	1,563	142,211
Wickets	22	2,979
Bowling average	26.72	19.84
5 wickets in innings	1	251
10 wickets in match	0	86
Best bowling	6/29	10/113
Catches/stumpings	3/–	312/–
- Source: CricInfo, 1 February 2020

Thomas William John Goddard (1 October 1900 – 22 May 1966) was an English cricketer and the fifth-highest wicket taker in first-class cricket.

== Biography ==
Born 1 October 1900 in Gloucester, Goddard joined Gloucestershire in 1922 as a fast bowler, Goddard met with so little success in his first six years that he was not re-engaged by Gloucestershire for 1928. However, determined to succeed, he joined the ground staff at Lord's and switched to off spin. With his massive hands and steep bounce due to his height (about 190 centimetres or six feet three inches), he was an immediate success and Gloucestershire re-engaged him for 1929. Even on the best of wickets Goddard was able to turn the ball substantially, and when the turf was worn or sticky he could spin to a remarkable degree. He earned a reputation as a voracious appealer, a sworn enemy of batsmen. Owing to his high trajectory, he could be easy to hit (it is estimated he was hit for 70 sixes a season between 1934 and 1938), and it is probable that this is why he was so expensive against the incomparable 1948 Australian side, and in some cases in county cricket. He played only once against Australia (in 1930) and only eight times against all countries – for much of Goddard's time, Hedley Verity was the preferred England spin bowler, and it is often thought that leg spinners rather than off spinners were favoured at this time in Tests. His successes in the matches he played (he took a hat-trick against South Africa in 1938–39) suggests he might have done well with more opportunities. He finished with six hat-tricks, the same as Parker and only one less than the all-time record of seven, held by D. V. P. Wright of Kent.

In 1929, his first season as a spinner, he took 184 wickets, and over 140 in the following two years. With Charlie Parker, he formed the most lethal bowling combination in county cricket, and, aided by the brilliant batting and catching of Wally Hammond, Gloucestershire had their most successful (though brief) era, finishing fourth in 1929, second in 1930 and second in 1931.

Goddard was forced to become Gloucestershire's chief bowler when the seemingly ageless Parker finally declined for good in 1932. Except in 1934 and 1938 when injuries handicapped him, and in 1948 when he lost form, Goddard took over 150 wickets in every season between 1932 and 1949, heading the first-class bowling averages in 1947 and 1949. In 1937 and 1947 (aided in the latter case by a sand dressing on the Bristol pitch that made the ball turn prodigiously), Goddard took 222 wickets for Gloucestershire, and fell two short of 250 wickets in all first-class matches in 1937 when he was one of the Wisden Cricketers of the Year.

His haul of 206 wickets in the 1947 County Championship was the last case of 200 wickets in a season in that competition. With slower over-rates and fewer matches, it is statistically harder for even a few bowlers today to take a third as many wickets.

Among his best bowling feats for Gloucestershire were:
– 17 for 106 against Kent at Bristol in 1939
– 16 for 99 against Worcestershire at Bristol in 1939
– 16 for 181 (10 for 113 in second innings) against Worcestershire at Cheltenham in 1937
– 15 for 107 (9 for 20 to finish match) on a "pitch of easy pace" against Derbyshire at Bristol in 1949.
– 9 for 37 against Leicestershire at Bristol in 1934
– 9 for 82 against Surrey at Cheltenham in 1946
– 9 for 21 against Cambridge University at Cheltenham in 1929

In 1951, at the age of fifty, Goddard was forced to retire due to an attack of pneumonia and pleurisy, but because he wanted so desperately to reach the 3,000-wicket mark, he came back for fourteen matches in 1952, even managing to pick up a ten-for, till at 51 years of age it became apparent his body could no longer support his immense will-power; he ended with 2,979 wickets, fifth on the all-time wickets tally after Wilfred Rhodes, Tich Freeman, Parker, and Jack Hearne. He left Gloucestershire's off-spin heritage safe in the hands of John Mortimore, Bomber Wells, and David Allen.

After he retired, Goddard ran a furniture shop in his home city of Gloucester, right up to a year before his death on 22 May 1966. From his shop, Goddard provided an early cable television service to customers in Gloucester in the 1950s. This pioneering system offered a superior reception to that which was available from rooftop aerials in the city.
