= Charlie Parker (cricketer) =

English cricketer

Personal information
- Full name: Charles Warrington Leonard Parker
- Born: 14 October 1882; Prestbury, Gloucestershire
- Died: 11 July 1959 (aged 76); Cranleigh, Surrey
- Batting: Right-handed
- Bowling: Slow left-arm orthodox

International information
- National side: England
- Only Test: 23 July 1921 v Australia

Domestic team information
- Years: Team
- 1903–1935: Gloucestershire

Career statistics
Competition	Test	First-class
Matches	1	635
Runs scored	3	7,951
Batting average	–	10.47
100s/50s	0/0	0/10
Top score	3*	82
Balls bowled	168	157,059
Wickets	2	3,278
Bowling average	16.00	19.46
5 wickets in innings	0	277
10 wickets in match	0	91
Best bowling	2/32	10/79
Catches/stumpings	0/–	247/–
- Source: CricInfo, 20 July 2021

Charles Warrington Leonard Parker (14 October 1882 – 11 July 1959) was an English cricketer, who stands as the third highest wicket taker in the history of first-class cricket, behind Wilfred Rhodes and Tich Freeman.

== Life and career ==
Parker paid no serious attention to cricket in his childhood, preferring to concentrate on golf. He only took to cricket around 1900 and was recommended to Gloucestershire by W. G. Grace in 1903. However, he played only twice in first-class cricket before 1907. From then on, he played regularly as a medium-paced left-hand bowler, but despite several excellent performances, he was always overshadowed by George Dennett until World War I put a halt to county cricket. By 1914, Parker had not taken 100 wickets in a season and in his last two years was very expensive, suggesting that his was to be an insignificant career.

After the war, Parker announced he was shifting to a slower style, and, with Dennett serving as an officer in the Army in India, Parker was forced to become Gloucestershire's chief bowler in 1919. He took more wickets than ever before in a season, but was still expensive even when the dry weather was taken into account. However, from 1920 Parker became one of the best left arm spin bowlers in England. A little quicker than most of his type (thus harder to hit), his long fingers gave Parker vicious spin which could hit off stump from outside leg and make him almost unplayable on rain affected or crumbling pitches. Though helped by appalling batting sides for much of his success, Parker took 125 wickets in 1920, 164 in 1921, 206 in 1922, 204 in 1924, and headed the first-class averages with 222 in 1925.

This success reflected Parker's ability to get through huge amounts of bowling: in 1926 and 1927 Parker passed 10,000 balls, and in the latter season he bowled over 85 per cent of Gloucestershire's overs from one end. He is one of only three bowlers to bowl over 10,000 balls in a season multiple times. (Note: The others are Tich Freeman in 1928, 1929, 1930, 1933 and 1934, and Alfred Shaw in 1876 and 1878.)

Among his best feats were 9 for 36 against Yorkshire in 1922 and 10 for 79 against Somerset in 1921. He took a hat trick in each innings against Middlesex at Bristol in 1924 after his Gloucestershire team had themselves been bowled out for 31. He took 17 for 56 against Essex in 1925, and 16 for 109 against Middlesex in 1930, the year he took 7 for 54 against the Australians in a famous tied match. From 1929 to 1931 he formed, with Tom Goddard, the most lethal bowling combination in county cricket, aided by the brilliant close fielding of Wally Hammond. He nearly completed what would have been a unique feat in taking five wickets in five balls in first-class cricket. He hit the stumps five times in consecutive balls in his benefit match for Gloucestershire against Yorkshire at the County Cricket Ground, Bristol in 1922, but the second was called a no-ball.

In 1931, though already forty-eight — an age at which most cricketers even in that era had already retired — Parker equalled Jack Hearne's record of taking 100 wickets by 12 June and his aggregate of 219 victims was the second highest of his career. However, age finally caught up with Parker in 1932 after a promising beginning. Though he still spun the ball considerably, he lost his accuracy of length and consequently was expensive. Because Gloucestershire had no support for him and Goddard, Parker continued to play until 1935, but never recovered his former powers.

Because Australian wickets of the 1920s and 1930s were totally unresponsive to his bowling, Parker was never even considered for a tour there. He did tour with private parties to the West Indies and on Lord Tennyson's 1924/1925 tour of South Africa — seen as at worst a very good "second eleven". Parker's bowling proved suitable for the matting wickets, but he did so little bowling in the five Representative Matches that he only took 11 wickets for 198 runs. In fact, he played only one Test, at Old Trafford in 1921, where he took 2 for 32 on a wicket too slow to be difficult — though he was discarded at the last minute in 1926 and 1930.

As a batsman, he rarely accomplished much, though he nearly did the match double (Note: A “match double” refers to the scoring 100 runs and taking of 10 wickets over two innings of a single first-class game.) against Leicestershire in 1921 and Somerset in 1922.

After he retired in 1935, Parker became an umpire until World War II. Following the war, he coached his old county club for a short period and then coached cricket at Cranleigh School almost up to his death on 11 July 1959.

=== World record ===
Charlie Parker was the first player to take three hat-tricks in a single first-class season. He achieved this in 1924. His record was later equaled by J.S. Rao in 1963–64, and Dean Headley in 1996.
