= Tich Freeman =

English cricketer (1888–1965)

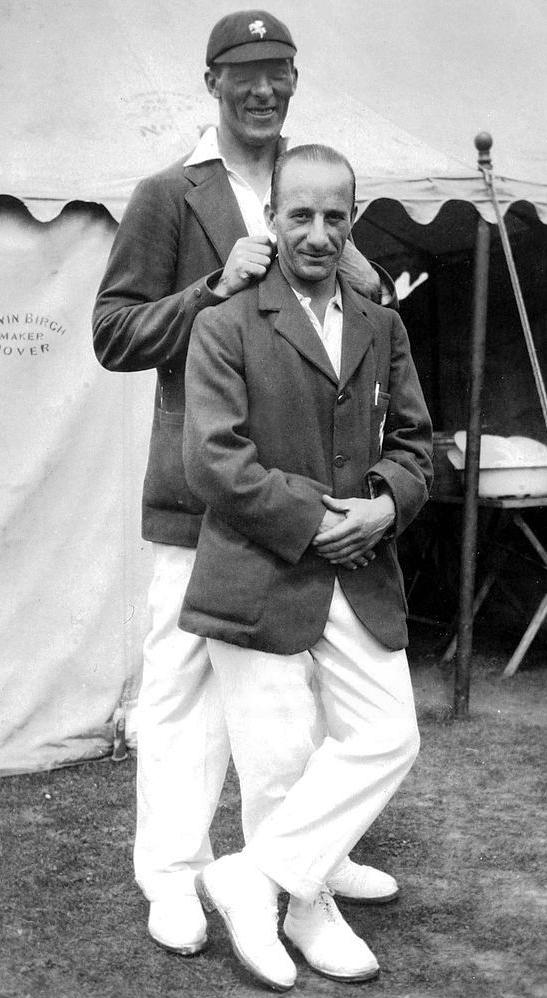
- Freeman (front) with Charlie Wright in about 1930

Personal information
- Full name: Alfred Percy Freeman
- Born: 17 May 1888; Lewisham, Kent, England
- Died: 28 January 1965 (aged 76); Bearsted, Kent, England
- Nickname: Tich (Note: The name Tich derives from a common term which refers to a short person.)
- Height: 5 ft 2 in (1.57 m)
- Batting: Right-handed
- Bowling: Right arm leg break
- Role: Bowler

International information
- National side: England (1924–1929)
- Test debut (cap 222): 19 December 1924 v Australia
- Last Test: 17 August 1929 v South Africa

Domestic team information
- Years: Team
- 1914–1936: Kent

Career statistics
Competition	Test	First-class
Matches	12	592
Runs scored	154	4,961
Batting average	14.00	9.50
100s/50s	0/1	0/4
Top score	50*	66
Balls bowled	3,732	154,312
Wickets	66	3,776
Bowling average	25.86	18.42
5 wickets in innings	5	386
10 wickets in match	3	140
Best bowling	7/71	10/53
Catches/stumpings	4/–	238/1
- Source: ESPNcricinfo, 8 April 2016

Alfred Percy "Tich" Freeman (17 May 1888 – 28 January 1965) was an English first-class cricketer. A leg spin bowler for Kent County Cricket Club and England, he is the only man to take 300 wickets in an English season and the second most prolific wicket-taker in first-class cricket history.

== Career ==
Freeman's common name came from his short stature, standing at 5 ft 2 in (1.57 m) tall. However, his stocky build and strong fingers gave him great bowling stamina, and he hated being taken off. His height gave his deliveries a low trajectory that was difficult for batsmen to reach on the full toss. This meant batsmen who did not play with a straight bat, or who lacked good footwork, rarely lasted long against him. Freeman relied chiefly on a leg-break that pitched on middle-and-leg, so that batsmen had to play at it, and a top-spinner that was notoriously difficult to detect and brought him hundreds of wickets; the googly he used sparingly. His bowling grip was somewhat unorthodox for a leg spinner: being such a small man with small hands, he gripped the ball between thumb, middle and index fingers rather than the orthodox leg break grip between the palm, index finger and ring finger.

Freeman, two of whose brothers played for Essex, played club cricket during the early 1910s and was engaged by Kent in 1914. After success with the second XI, he was regularly selected for the first team later in the season, but World War I then halted county cricket until 1919. Figures of 7 for 25 against Warwickshire had shown Freeman's promise; when cricket resumed in 1919, he developed rapidly. He took 60 wickets in a short season in 1919, 102 in 1920, 166 in 1921 and 194 in 1922. He was named a Wisden Cricketer of the Year in 1923 and took 17 for 67 on a rain-affected pitch against Sussex in 1922.

In 1924, Freeman's bowling for the Players (6 for 52 in the first innings) against the Gentlemen earned him a place in the Marylebone Cricket Club (MCC) tour to Australia. However, owing to the rock-hard pitches and the superb footwork of Australia's batsmen, Freeman proved expensive in the two Tests in which he was selected. Freeman continued to dominate Kent's bowling in the following three years but was only modestly successful against South Africa in 1927–1928.

1928 was Freeman's most successful year: he set his record of 304 first-class wickets, including 22 wickets in three Tests against the West Indies (and also took 9 for 104 against them for Kent). In 1929 Freeman took 22 wickets in two Tests against South Africa, but their batsmen's mastery over him in the Fifth Test, when he did not take a wicket in 49 overs and conceded 169 runs, meant that this Test was his last. Yet, between 1930 and 1933 Kent so depended upon Freeman's bowling that he took 951 County Championship wickets (over 55% of Kent's total) for only 15.21 runs each. Among his best performances in these years were:

- 17 for 92 against Warwickshire at Folkestone in 1932
- 16 for 82 against Northamptonshire at Tunbridge Wells in 1932
- 16 for 94 (10 for 53 in first innings) against Essex at Southend in 1930
- 15 for 94 against Somerset at Canterbury in 1931
- 15 for 122 against Middlesex at Lord's in 1933
- 15 for 142 against Essex at Gravesend in 1931
- 15 for 144 against Leicestershire at Maidstone in 1931
- 10 for 79 in an innings against Lancashire at Manchester in 1931
- 9 for 50 against Derbyshire at Ilkeston in 1930 (match figures of 12 for 210)

Freeman also did well against the 1930 Australians, taking 5 for 78, but he was never selected for a home Ashes Test.

In 1934 and 1935, although he was still the leading wicket-taker in England, Freeman fell away gradually. His average rose from around 15 to over 21 runs per wicket and he was rarely as successful as before; however, his work rate still earned him many wickets. In early 1936, Freeman was again strong and took 70 wickets in the first fourteen matches. With only 33 wickets in the next fourteen games, Kent did not re-engage him for 1937. Freeman played for Walsall in the Birmingham and District League for a few years after that. He was granted life membership of Marylebone Cricket Club (MCC) in 1949. After retirement Freeman opened a chain of sports retail shops in partnership with his old Kent teammate Jack Hubble. He christened his retirement cottage "Dunbowlin'".

== Records ==
The many bowling records he holds include:

- Taking 1673 wickets in six consecutive seasons from 1928 to 1933–in each of these seasons he took over 250 wickets, something no other bowler has done even once since 1901.
- Ten wickets in an innings on three occasions (1929, 1930 and 1931).
- Seventeen wickets in a match twice, in 1922. and 1932
- The three highest totals of balls bowled in a season in 1928, 1930 and 1933.
- Ten or more wickets in a match on 140 occasions, more than 50% ahead of his nearest rival Charlie Parker.
- 48.6% of his 3776 first-class wickets were taken without assistance (either bowled, caught and bowled, leg before wicket, or hit wicket).
- Second only to Wilfred Rhodes in his aggregate of first-class wickets, Freeman accumulated his in little more than half as many matches (Freeman took 3,776 wickets in 592 matches, Rhodes 4,204 in 1,110). He is just second to Wilfred Rhodes for taking the most wickets in all forms of cricket (List A, first-class, T20).
- He holds the record for taking the most five wicket hauls in first-class cricket. Freeman's total of 386 is 99 ahead of Rhodes' tally and far exceeds cross-format aggregates from the limited-overs era.
