= List of Gloucestershire cricket captains =

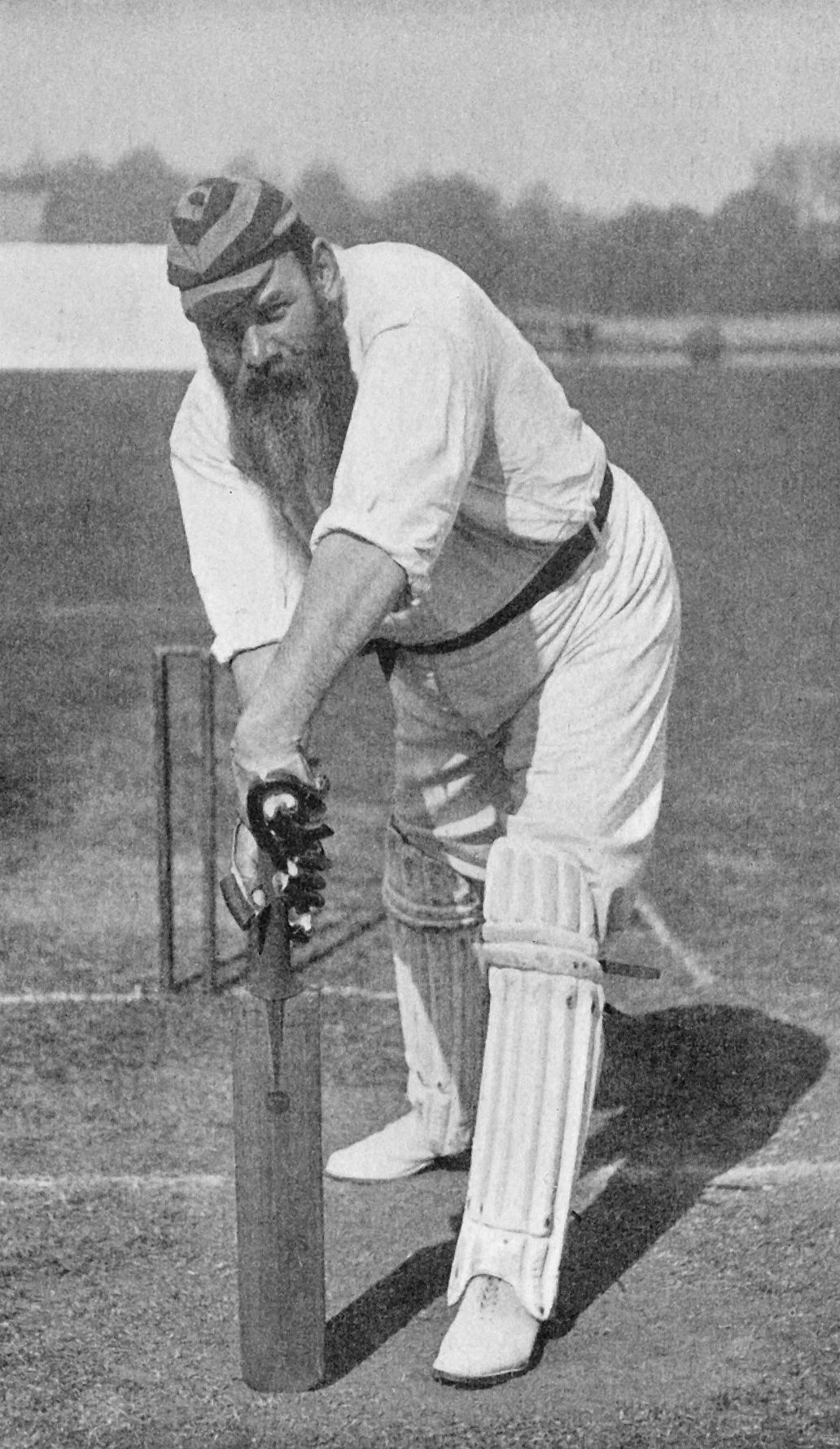
W. G. Grace was the first club captain of Gloucestershire County Cricket Club

Gloucestershire County Cricket Club are an English cricket club based in Bristol. The club has played first-class cricket since 1870 against Surrey. The club have played both List A cricket and Twenty20 cricket since their introductions into the English game in 1963 and 2003 respectively.

The county were captained for their first 29 years of first-class cricket by W. G. Grace, whose family had helped form the club. The 359 first-class matches which he captained are the most by any player, eclipsing the combined 327 matches of Mark Alleyne, who led the county in all three formats of the game. Alleyne captained the county during its most prosperous spell, during which time they won eight one-day trophies. Gloucestershire have never won the official County Championship, but have been runners-up on a number of occasions. They achieved this twice under the captaincy of Bev Lyon, whose captaincy was the primary factor in him being named as one of the Wisden Cricketers of the Year in 1931. Wisden noted that he was "a possible England captain," though he never went on to appear for England.

The majority of Gloucestershire's captains have been English, as only Mike Procter, Courtney Walsh and Cameron Bancroft have played Test cricket for different nations (Michael Klinger played T20I cricket for Australia). Walter Troup, Cyril Sewell and George Emmett were all born outside of the United Kingdom, but within the British Empire. Three members of the Graveney family captained the county: Tom Graveney from 1959 to 1960, his brother Ken Graveney from 1963 to 1964, and the latter's son David Graveney between 1982 and 1988.

== Key ==
- Years denotes the years in which the player was named as official club captain for Gloucestershire.
- First denotes the date of the first match in which the player captained Gloucestershire.
- Last denotes the date of the last match in which the player captained Gloucestershire.
- FC denotes the number of first-class matches in which the player captained Gloucestershire.
- LA denotes the number of List A matches in which the player captained Gloucestershire.
- T20 denotes the number of Twenty20 matches in which the player captained Gloucestershire.
- Total denotes the total number of first-class, List A and Twenty20 matches in which the player captained Gloucestershire.

== Official captains ==
No.	Name	Nationality	Years	First	Last	FC	LA	T20	Total	Refs
1	W. G. Grace	England	1870–1899	28 July 1870	25 May 1899	359	–	–	359	
2	Walter Troup	England	1899	15 May 1899	29 June 1911	21	–	–	21	
3	Gilbert Jessop	England	1900–1912	14 May 1900	4 August 1913	252	–	–	252	
4	Cyril Sewell	England	1913–1914	23 May 1912	31 August 1914	47	–	–	47	
5	Foster Robinson	England	1919–1921	23 May 1919	30 August 1922	62	–	–	62	
6	Philip Williams	England	1922–1923	30 June 1920	20 May 1925	49	–	–	49	
7	Douglas Robinson	England	1924–1926	11 June 1921	21 August 1926	86	–	–	86	
8	William Rowlands	England	1927–1928	28 May 1921	25 August 1928	60	–	–	60	
9	Bev Lyon	England	1929–1934	29 May 1926	19 August 1939	128	–	–	128	
10	Dallas Page	England	1935–1936	2 May 1934	29 August 1936	83	–	–	83	
11	Basil Allen	England	1937–1938; 1947–1950	22 July 1933	2 September 1950	190	–	–	190	
12	Wally Hammond	England	1939–1946	6 June 1931	10 August 1946	63	–	–	63	
13	Derrick Bailey	England	1951–1952	15 June 1949	30 August 1952	51	–	–	51	
14	Jack Crapp	England	1953–1954	12 May 1951	1 June 1955	64	–	–	64	
15	George Emmett	England	1955–1958	3 June 1953	15 August 1959	140	–	–	140	
16	Tom Graveney	England	1959–1960	13 June 1951	27 August 1960	49	–	–	49	
17	Tom Pugh	England	1961–1962	29 April 1961	5 September 1962	45	–	–	45	
18	Ken Graveney	England	1963–1964	1 May 1963	2 September 1964	56	2	–	58	
19	John Mortimore	England	1965–1967	29 April 1964	6 September 1967	94	4	–	98	
20	Arthur Milton	England	1968	17 July 1957	13 September 1969	45	5	–	50	
21	Tony Brown	England	1969–1976	27 April 1969	8 September 1976	165	149	–	314	
22	Mike Procter	South Africa	1977–1981	26 May 1971	1 July 1981	93	94	–	187	
23	David Graveney	England	1982–1988	13 May 1981	14 September 1988	170	144	–	314	
24	Bill Athey	England	1989	12 July 1987	30 August 1992	29	24	–	53	
25	Tony Wright	England	1990–1993	2 May 1989	7 July 1993	78	82	–	160	
26	Courtney Walsh	West Indies	1993–1994; 1996	4 August 1990	19 September 1996	41	36	–	77	
27	Jack Russell	England	1995	8 August 1993	19 July 2002	24	37	–	61	
28	Mark Alleyne	England	1997–2005	25 June 1994	25 September 2005	115	194	18	327	
29	Jon Lewis	England	2006–2008	20 July 2005	4 June 2009	29	21	14	64	
30	Alex Gidman	England	2009–2012	10 August 2005	11 September 2012	86	73	33	192	
31	Michael Klinger	Australia	2013–2014	2013	2017	-	-	-	-	
32	Geraint Jones	England	2015	2014	2015	-	-	-	-	
33	Gareth Roderick	England (Note: South African born but England qualified.)	2016-2017	2013	2020	-	-	-	-	
34	Chris Dent	England	2018-2021	2009	2021	-	-	-	-	
35	Graeme van Buuren	England	2021-2024	2021	2024	-	-	-		
36	Cameron Bancroft	Australia	2025-2026	2025	-	-	-	-		
