= Graveney (disambiguation) =

Graveney is a village in Swale, Kent.

Graveney may also refer to:

== People ==
- David Graveney (born 1953), Gloucestershire, Somerset and Durham cricketer
- Ken Graveney (1924-2015), Gloucestershire cricketer
- Tom Graveney (1927-2015), Gloucestershire, Worcestershire and England cricketer

== Other ==
- Graveney School, in Tooting, London, England
- River Graveney, a tributary of the River Wandle
- Graveney (Merton ward), in London, England
