= John Martin (cricketer, born 1941) =

English cricketer

Personal information
- Full name: John Douglas Martin
- Born: 23 December 1941; Oxford, England
- Died: 6 July 2024 (aged 82); Reading, Berkshire, England
- Batting: Right-handed
- Bowling: Right-arm fast-medium
- Role: Bowler

Domestic team information
- Years: Team
- 1962–65: Oxford University
- 1964–65: Somerset
- First-class debut: 2 May 1962 Oxford University v Gloucestershire
- Last First-class: 13 July 1965 Somerset v Glamorgan

Career statistics
Competition	First-class
Matches	40
Runs scored	148
Batting average	3.89
100s/50s	0/0
Top score	14*
Balls bowled	6317
Wickets	93
Bowling average	29.04
5 wickets in innings	4
10 wickets in match	–
Best bowling	7/26
Catches/stumpings	13/–
- Source: CricketArchive, 17 February 2011

John Douglas Martin (23 December 1941 – 6 July 2024) was an English cricketer who played first-class cricket for Oxford University and Somerset in the 1960s. He also played Minor Counties cricket for Oxfordshire and Berkshire. He was born in Oxford.

Martin was a tail-end right-handed batsman and a right-arm fast-medium bowler. Educated at Magdalen College School in Oxford, he played Minor Counties cricket for Oxfordshire from 1959, and he took four Somerset wickets in the 1961 Minor Counties Championship challenge match, which was won by Somerset's second eleven. The following season, 1962, he joined Somerset, playing mostly second eleven cricket for the next four summers after the end of the university term, and appearing only twice in the county's first team.

The bulk of Martin's first-class cricket was played for Oxford University. He was a freshman undergraduate at St Edmund Hall in 1962 and opened the bowling in the first match of the season against Gloucestershire: Martin Young and Ron Nicholls put on 395 for the first wicket for Gloucestershire, still the highest first-class partnership for any wicket for the county, though Martin did have Young caught behind the wicket. Playing in just six matches because of examinations, Martin took only nine first-class wickets in what Wisden Cricketers' Almanack declared was a "depressing" season. Four of those came in the University match, where he won his blue. He was a lot more successful in 1963, taking 26 first-class wickets including his first five-wicket haul, a return of six for 70 in the match against Marylebone Cricket Club (MCC) when his victims included four England Test batsmen. In the University match, however, he retired with influenza after bowling only five overs. In 1964, he missed the match with Cambridge entirely through injury, though earlier in the season, he had produced the best bowling figures of his first-class career by taking seven Derbyshire wickets for just 26 runs in a rain-ruined match.

In December 1964, Martin was a member of an MCC team that toured South America for a month: the team consisted mainly of former public school players and there were matches in Chile, Brazil and Argentina. In the 1965 season, Martin was captain of the Oxford University side and had his best-ever bowling season, taking 37 wickets for the university side at an average of 19.24. After almost leading his side to victory in the 1965 University match, though, Martin played only one further first-class match, his second for Somerset after one in the 1964 season. He continued to play second eleven cricket for Somerset until the end of the 1966 season and made one fleeting appearance six years later for Berkshire in the Minor Counties. A negligible batsman, he reached double figures only five times in 40 matches (twice in one match) and his highest score was just 14.

Martin became a schoolmaster, teaching at Wellington College in Berkshire from 1966 until he retired as deputy head in 2002. He died in a hospital in Reading on 6 July 2024, aged 82.
