= List of batsmen who have scored 100 centuries in first-class cricket =

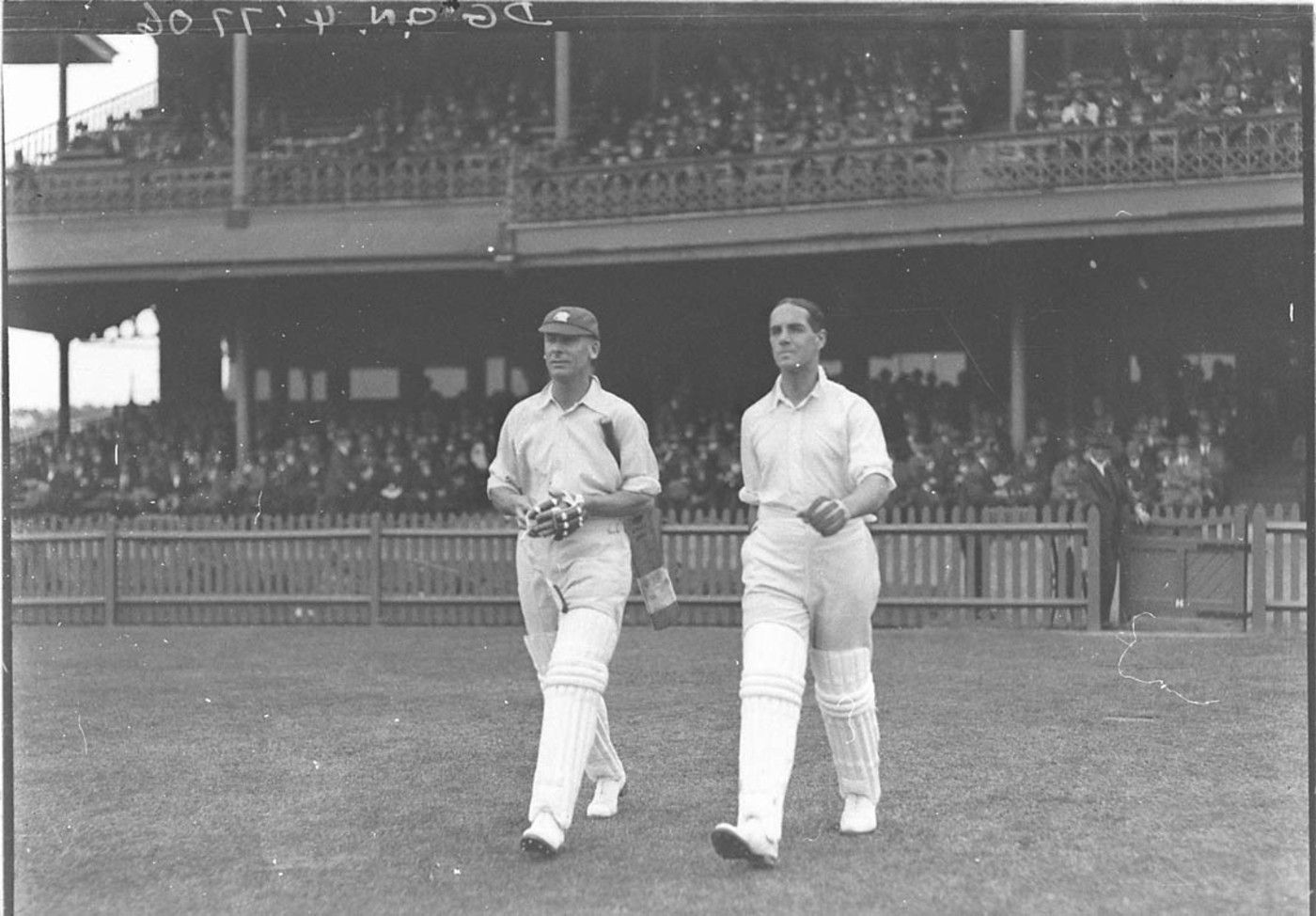
Jack Hobbs and Herbert Sutcliffe walk out to the middle at the Sydney Cricket Ground in a Test match. Both Hobbs and Sutcliffe scored over 100 first-class centuries; with Hobbs holding the record for most centuries in a first-class career.

In the sport of cricket, a batsman is said to have scored a century when they reach a score of 100 or more runs in an innings without being dismissed. In first-class cricket, the highest form of the game below international level, a total of 25 players have achieved the feat on a hundred or more occasions. For statistical purposes, any centuries scored in a Test match are included as first-class centuries (as shown in the Table below).

The first cricketer to achieve the feat was W. G. Grace, who completed his hundredth century in May 1895. Grace remains the only batsman to have achieved the feat and finished with a batting average below 40.

The English County Championship has historically always been the first-class competition in which the most matches are played per season, hence the most conducive competition to prolific run-scoring. Of the 25 men to have scored 100 first-class centuries, all have been either natively English or English-qualified except Donald Bradman of Australia, Zaheer Abbas of Pakistan, Glenn Turner of New Zealand and West Indian Viv Richards. Zaheer Abbas (Gloucestershire), Turner (Worcestershire) and Richards (Somerset) all had substantial county careers as overseas players; Bradman, the first non-English batsman to achieve the feat, therefore remains the only batsman to have done so despite never having played for an English county side. He also achieved the feat in the fewest innings and at the highest average.

Geoffrey Boycott became the first player to score his 100th century in a Test match, doing so against Australia at his home ground of Headingley in August 1977. Subsequently Zaheer Abbas is the only other player to achieve the feat in a Test match.

== Batsmen with 100 centuries or above ==
Note: this list uses the figures accepted by the Wisden Cricketers' Almanack. For details on the difference between these figures and those used by other sources, see Variations in first-class cricket statistics.
Key

- **100s** denotes how many centuries the batsman scored in first-class cricket.
- **Nation** denotes the country for which the batsman played Test cricket was from; the number following indicates the number of centuries scored in Test cricket (in bold) plus the number of other first-class centuries scored for the national side.
- **100th** denotes the year in which the batsman scored his one-hundredth century in first-class cricket.
- **ItH** denotes how many innings it took the batsman to reach his hundredth century in first-class cricket.
- **Inns** denotes how many innings the batsman played.
- **Runs** denotes the number of runs scored by the batsman in his first-class career.
- **Ave** denotes the batsman's career batting average.
- ♠ denotes the batsman scored their hundredth century in a Test match.

Rank	100s	Player	Nation (100s)	(England) (Wales) County (100s)	100th	ItH	Career	Inns	Runs	Ave	Notes
1	199	Jack Hobbs	England (**15**)	Surrey (144)	1923	821	1905–1934	1,315	61,237	50.65	
2	170	Patsy Hendren	England (**7**+1)	Middlesex (119)	1928–29	740	1907–1938	1,300	57,611	50.80	
3	167	Wally Hammond	England (**22**+4)	Gloucestershire (113)	1935	680	1923–1950	1,005	50,551	56.10	
4	153	Phil Mead	England (**4**)	Hampshire (138)	1927	892	1905–1936	1,340	55,061	47.67	
5	151	Geoffrey Boycott ♠	England (**22**+3)	Yorkshire (103)	1977	645	1962–1986	1,014	48,426	56.83	
6	149	Herbert Sutcliffe	England (**16**+2)	Yorkshire (112)	1932	700	1919–1945	1,088	50,138	51.95	
7	145	Frank Woolley	England (**5**+3)	Kent (122)	1929	1,031	1906–1938	1,532	58,969	40.75	
8	136	Graeme Hick	England (**6**)	Worcestershire (106)	1998	574	1983–2008	871	41,112	52.23	
9	129	Len Hutton	England (**19**+1)	Yorkshire (85)	1951	619	1934–1960	814	40,140	55.51	
10	128	Graham Gooch	England (**20**)	Essex (94)	1992–93	820	1973–2000	990	44,846	49.01	
11	124	W. G. Grace	England (**2**+2)	Gloucestershire (49)	1895	1,113	1865–1908	1,493	54,896	39.55	
12	123	Denis Compton	England (**17**)	Middlesex (67)	1952	552	1936–1964	839	38,942	51.85	
13	122	Tom Graveney	England (**11**)	Gloucestershire (50); Worcestershire (27)	1964	940	1948–1972	1,223	47,793	44.91	
14	117	Donald Bradman	Australia (**29**+36)	—	1947–48	295	1927–1949	338	28,067	95.14	
15=	114	Viv Richards	West Indies (**24**+23)	Somerset (47); Glamorgan (10)	1988–89	658	1971–1993	796	36,212	49.40	
15=	114	Mark Ramprakash	England (**2**+3)	Middlesex (46); Surrey (60)	2008	676	1987–2012	764	35,659	53.14	
17	108	Zaheer Abbas ♠	Pakistan (**12**+17)	Gloucestershire (49)	1982–83	658	1965–1987	768	34,843	51.54	
18=	107	Andy Sandham	England (**2**)	Surrey (83)	1935	871	1911–1938	1,000	41,284	44.82	
18=	107	Colin Cowdrey	England (**22**+1)	Kent (58)	1973	1,035	1950–1976	1,130	42,719	42.89	
20	104	Tom Hayward	England (**3**)	Surrey (88)	1913	1,076	1893–1914	1,138	43,551	41.79	
21=	103	Glenn Turner	New Zealand (**7**+9)	Worcestershire (72)	1982	779	1964–1983	792	34,346	49.70	
21=	103	John Edrich	England (**12**)	Surrey (81)	1977	945	1956–1978	979	39,790	45.47	
23=	102	Les Ames	England (**8**+4)	Kent (78)	1950	916	1926–1951	951	37,248	43.51	
23=	102	Ernest Tyldesley	England (**3**+1)	Lancashire (90)	1934	919	1909–1936	961	38,874	45.46	
23=	102	Dennis Amiss	England (**11**+1)	Warwickshire (78)	1986	1,081	1960–1987	1,139	43,423	42.86	
