= Herbert Page =

English cricketer

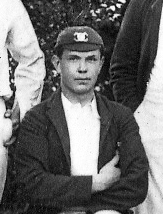

Personal information
- Full name: Herbert Vivian Page
- Born: 30 October 1862; Lancaster, Lancashire, England
- Died: 1 August 1927 (aged 64); Cheltenham, Gloucestershire, England
- Batting: Right-handed
- Bowling: Right arm off break, right arm medium pace
- Role: All-rounder
- Relatives: Dallas Page (son)

Domestic team information
- Years: Team
- 1883–1886: Oxford University
- 1883–1895: Gloucestershire
- 1886: Marylebone Cricket Club

Career statistics
Competition	First-class
Matches	146
Runs scored	4,005
Batting average	17.80
100s/50s	1/15
Top score	116
Balls bowled	10,957
Wickets	212
Bowling average	23.24
5 wickets in innings	5
10 wickets in match	0
Best bowling	6/28
Catches/stumpings	112/14
- Source: , 7 April 2012

Herbert Vivian Page (30 October 1862 – 1 August 1927) was a first-class cricketer who played for Oxford University and Gloucestershire.

An all-rounder, Page scored 4,005 runs and took 212 wickets in first-class cricket. As an occasional wicket-keeper, he also made 14 stumpings. He played for Cheltenham College in 1881 and 1882 with some success, and when he went to Wadham College, Oxford, he made the university cricket team in his first year. Playing in the University Match against Cambridge each year between 1883 and 1886, he scored consistently, reached fifty on two occasions, and was captain in his final two years.

Page also played for Gloucestershire between 1883 and 1895, scoring one century, and was regularly selected in the prestigious Gentlemen v Players matches between 1884 and 1894. Although selected for a representative tour to Australia in 1887–88, he was unable to go. According to Wisden Cricketers' Almanack, his best innings was a score of 93 runs against Nottinghamshire, a team possessing a strong bowling attack, in 1883. Page also played rugby for Oxford and Gloucestershire, and hockey for East Gloucestershire, captaining the latter club for 22 years. Between 1888 and 1923, Page held a teaching post at Cheltenham College.

According to his Wisden obituary, Page was a "capital batsman, possessing strong defence and good hitting power. He was also a medium-paced bowler with a curl from leg and a break from the off, could keep a good length and was to be relied on. In the field he was hard-working and excellent, being safe in any position." Jack Hobbs claimed in 1935 that Page could bowl the googly while at the university in the 1880s, some time before Bernard Bosanquet is credited with the delivery's invention. Hobbs' source was Kingsmill Key, a contemporary of Page at Oxford and later a captain of Surrey; however, Key stated that Page merely bowled it as a distraction and never used it in a first-class match.

Page's son Dallas was captain of Gloucestershire in 1935 and 1936.
