= John Sewell (cricketer) =

English cricketer (1844–1897)

John Joseph Sewell (10 February 1844 – 8 June 1897) was an English first-class cricketer active 1863–67 who played for Middlesex. He was born in Cirencester and died in Pietermaritzburg. He played in twelve first-class matches.

Sewell moved to the Cape Colony in the 1870s. His son Cyril played cricket for South Africa and later moved to England and captained Gloucestershire.
