= Atco =

Atco or ATCO may refer to:

== Businesses ==
- ATCO, a Canadian diversified company involved in manufacturing, utilities, energy and technologies
  - ATCO Electric, a subsidiary of the above company
- Atco (British company), a mower manufacturing company
- Atco Records, an American record label
- Arnold Transit Company

== Places in the United States ==
- Atco, Georgia, an unincorporated community
- Atco, New Jersey, an unincorporated community
  - Atco station, a railroad station in the above community
- Atco Lake, New Jersey

== Sports facilities ==
- Atco Raceway, a drag strip in Atco, New Jersey
- ATCO Field, a soccer stadium in Alberta, Canada

== Acronyms ==
- Air Traffic Control Officer (ATCO)

== See also ==
- Atco Formation, a geologic formation in Texas
