= John Williams (cricketer, born 1878) =

English cricketer

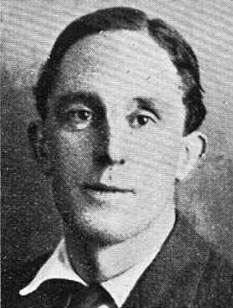

Personal information
- Full name: John Nathaniel Williams
- Born: 27 January 1878; Kensington, London, England
- Died: 25 April 1915 (aged 37); Gaba Tepe, Anzac Cove, Ottoman Turkey
- Batting: Right-handed
- Relatives: Philip Williams (brother)

Domestic team information
- Years: Team
- 1903–04: Hawke's Bay
- 1908: Gloucestershire
- Source: Cricinfo, 30 March 2014

John Nathaniel Williams (27 January 1878 – 25 April 1915) was an English cricketer. He played for Hawke's Bay in 1903 and Gloucestershire in 1908.

The son of Sir Robert Williams, Williams was educated at Eton and Oxford University. He went to New Zealand, where he worked in the gold mining industry at Waihi. He enlisted in the New Zealand armed forces as a private, and was killed in action at Gallipoli on 25 April 1915 during the Landing at Anzac Cove.
