= John Mortimore (cricketer) =

English cricketer

Personal information
- Full name: John Brian Mortimore
- Born: 14 May 1933; Southmead, Bristol, England
- Died: 13 February 2014 (aged 80)
- Batting: Right-handed
- Bowling: Right-arm offbreak

International information
- National side: England
- Test debut: 13 February 1959 v Australia
- Last Test: 23 July 1964 v Australia

Career statistics
Competition	Test	First-class
Matches	9	640
Runs scored	243	15,891
Batting average	24.30	18.30
100s/50s	0/1	4/65
Top score	73*	149
Balls bowled	2,162	113,417
Wickets	13	1,807
Bowling average	56.38	23.18
5 wickets in innings	0	75
10 wickets in match	0	8
Best bowling	3/36	8/59
Catches/stumpings	3/–	345/–
- Source: CricInfo, 7 November 2022

John Brian Mortimore (14 May 1933 – 13 February 2014) was an English cricketer, who played in nine Tests for England from 1959 to 1964, and captained Gloucestershire between 1965 and 1967.

== Career ==
His county colleague and fellow off-spinner, David Allen, spun the ball more than Mortimore, but “Morty” was able to coax county batsmen with cunning and pin-point accuracy, which often led to their downfall.

He was sent out as a replacement for Peter May's struggling team in the 1958-59 Ashes series, and topped the batting averages by dint of being out only once in the series, 55 runs (55.00). Unfortunately, at the time England was awash with capable off-spinners who could bat; Ray Illingworth, Fred Titmus and Allen all averaged 20–25 with the bat, and 30–32 per wicket with the ball, and this restricted Mortimore's Test appearances.

Mortimore toured India in 1963–64, playing three Tests in a notoriously slow-scoring series. In the Fifth Test at Kanpur, on a pitch Wisden described as "defunct", he had match figures of 71–45–67–1. He had the misfortune to be brought into the England side for the Fourth Test against Australia at Old Trafford in 1964, when only 18 wickets fell for 1271 runs. He took no wicket for 122 off 49 overs and never played Test cricket again.

Mortimore had a 26-year stint at Bristol, and captained the county side for three seasons. He scored more than 15,000 runs and took over 1,800 wickets in his first-class career. He took 100 or more wickets in a season three times, scored 1,000 runs or more in a season five times, and in 1959, 1963 and 1964 he did both in the one season, or “the double”.

His highest score came against Nottinghamshire at Nottingham in 1963, when he scored 149, “a brilliant maiden Championship century by Mortimore in two hours twenty minutes”, said Wisden; he hit 52 in the second innings of the same match to help Gloucestershire to victory by five wickets, putting on 109 in 40 minutes with Ray White.

Mortimore is sometimes remembered for his role in the dramatic conclusion of a televised 1971 Gillette Cup semi-final between Gloucestershire and Lancashire at Old Trafford, when he was hit for 24 runs in an over by David Hughes in fading light as Lancashire emerged victorious. However, two years later Mortimore helped Gloucestershire to win the same tournament, appearing as they beat Sussex in the final.

Having played for Gloucestershire since 1950, Mortimore retired after playing two games in the 1975 season, at the age of 42. In his first game, he had played alongside the brothers Tom and Ken Graveney; in his last game he played alongside Ken's son David.
