= John Pugh (cricketer) =

English cricketer

Personal information
- Full name: John Geoffrey Pugh
- Born: 22 January 1904; Coventry, Warwickshire, England
- Died: 14 February 1964 (aged 60); Hastings, Christ Church, Barbados
- Batting: Right-handed
- Bowling: Right-arm medium
- Relatives: Tom Pugh (nephew)

Domestic team information
- Years: Team
- 1922–1927: Warwickshire

Career statistics
Competition	First-class
Matches	9
Runs scored	82
Batting average	9.11
100s/50s	–/–
Top score	41
Balls bowled	348
Wickets	6
Bowling average	34.33
5 wickets in innings	–
10 wickets in match	–
Best bowling	4/100
Catches/stumpings	3/–
- Source: Cricinfo, 14 July 2012

John Geoffrey Pugh (22 January 1904 – 14 February 1964) was an English cricketer. Pugh was a right-handed batsman who bowled right-arm medium pace. He was born at Coventry, Warwickshire, and was educated at Rugby School.

Pugh made his first-class debut for Warwickshire against Northamptonshire at Edgbaston in the 1922 County Championship. He made eight further first-class appearances for the county, the last of which came against Surrey in the 1927 County Championship. In his nine first-class matches, he scored a total of 82 runs at an average of 9.11, with a high score of 41. With the ball, he took 6 wickets at a bowling average of 34.33, with best figures of 4/100.

He died at Hastings, Barbados, on 14 February 1964. His nephew, Tom Pugh, also played first-class cricket.
