= Dar Lyon =

English cricketer

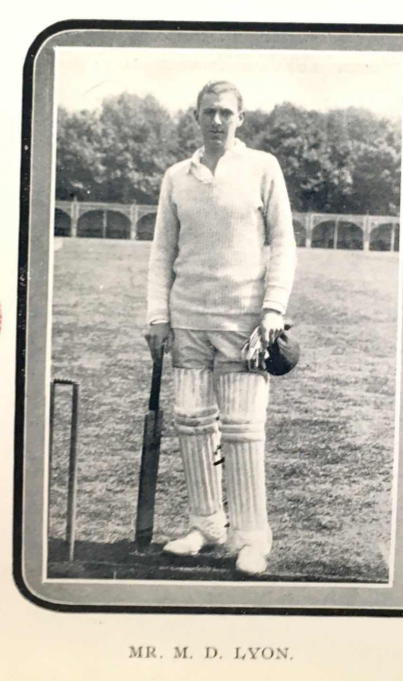

Personal information
- Full name: Malcolm Douglas Lyon
- Born: 22 April 1898; Caterham, Surrey, England
- Died: 17 February 1964 (aged 65); St Leonards-on-Sea, Sussex, England
- Batting: Right-handed
- Role: Wicket-keeper batsman
- Relatives: Beverley Lyon (brother)

Domestic team information
- Years: Team
- 1920–1938: Somerset
- 1920–1922: Cambridge University
- FC debut: 29 May 1920 Somerset v Cambridge University
- Last FC: 31 August 1938 Somerset v Leicestershire

Career statistics
Competition	First-class
Matches	158
Runs scored	7,290
Batting average	29.27
100s/50s	14/31
Top score	219
Balls bowled	891
Wickets	8
Bowling average	71.75
5 wickets in innings	0
10 wickets in match	0
Best bowling	3/43
Catches/stumpings	150/43
- Source: CricketArchive, 13 October 2009

Malcolm Douglas Lyon (22 April 1898 – 17 February 1964), generally known as Dar Lyon was an English first-class cricketer who played for Somerset County Cricket Club through the 1920s. He was a right-handed top order batsman known for his beautiful driving who occasionally captained and kept wicket for the county.

He also became a politician, barrister, and later a magistrate, colonial administrator and judge in various British colonies. He was Chief Justice of the Seychelles from 1948 to 1957.

== Early career ==
Born in Caterham, Surrey, on 22 April 1898, Lyon was educated at Rugby School. He enjoyed a lot of success in school cricket, playing in the school XI for three years, and captaining the side in his final year. He finished his schooling in the middle of the First World War (1914–1918), and was called up for service in the British Army. He initially served in the ranks of the Royal Field Artillery, but was commissioned as an officer, with the rank of second lieutenant, on 20 February 1917. He was wounded in action during the war.

After demobilisation in 1919, Lyon chose to continue his studies at Trinity College, Cambridge. During his first year, he only played one first-class match for the university, against the Marylebone Cricket Club (MCC) at Lord's, and failed to get a 'blue'. His first-class debut however, came earlier than this, when he turned out for Somerset against Cambridge University Cricket Club at the end of May 1920. In the following match, a County Championship tie against Worcestershire, Lyon scored his maiden first-class century, hitting 115 in 135 minutes.

During his second year, Lyon got his 'blue', appearing in seven first-class matches for Cambridge University before keeping wicket for a strong Cambridge side during the University Match against Oxford University Cricket Club. In a reversal from the previous year, he also played for Cambridge University against his Somerset team-mates. He once again kept wicket for a victorious Cambridge side against Oxford the following year. While at Cambridge he was also a member of Footlights, and president from 1921 to 1923.

== England prospect ==
Lyon was described in his Wisden obituary as being "considered by many to be among the best batsmen who never gained a cap for England". An amateur, he passed 1,000 runs in the 1923 season, and was selected to play for the Gentlemen in July of the same year. He scored 120 in the match, putting on 219 in a second wicket partnership with Greville Stevens. The following season, he was selected to play for 'The Rest' against England, in a three-day Test Trial match. Lyon recorded scores of 32 and 3, and took a catch in both innings during a three wicket loss. Lyon was the only member of the team not to go on to represent England at Test cricket. Fellow Somerset batsman Jack MacBryan wasn't impressed, saying of his friend, "Dar is a grand chap and a very fine cricketer. Don't know what the Test selectors were thinking about." Later in the season, he hit his highest total in first-class cricket as he made 219 against Derbyshire. He once again represented the Gentlemen, but after scoring 11 in the first innings, was out for a duck in the second.

Lyon only made six appearances in the County Championship during the 1925 season, the highlight being a century during the 93 run loss to Warwickshire. The following summer of 1926 was among the last in which Lyon played a significant number of games for Somerset, as he spent more and more time on his legal career, with his 20 appearances yielding 1062 runs. In a match against the touring Australians, Lyon showed the England selectors what they were missing out on. He played Clarrie Grimmett with little regard for the wrist-spinner's reputation and struck 136 runs in an innings total of only 245 for Somerset. He finished the summer on a high with a further century coming in the final match against Yorkshire.

Recognition did come in the form of a call-up for the Marylebone Cricket Club (MCC) in May 1927, with Lyon making a half-century against Surrey, followed by a century against the New Zealanders. Sporadic performances in the late 1920s and early 1930s were highlighted by centuries against Essex and Surrey. When he was appointed to Gambia in 1932, Lyon's first-class cricket career was all but ended. A further appearance in 1935 against Middlesex resulted in a pair. He returned to Somerset in 1938, and played his final season for the county.

== Later life ==
In 1923 Lyon took up farming in Suffolk. In 1925, he was called to the bar, practising on the South Eastern Circuit and in London. He stood as Liberal party candidate for Bury St Edmunds at the 1929 general election, finishing second. He was appointed a magistrate in Gambia in 1932. On 9 June 1933 (now described as an acting legal adviser) he was appointed to both the Executive and Legislative Councils of Gambia as one of the official advisors of the governor. He was then appointed a resident magistrate in Tanganyika, where he served until 1938.

With the outbreak of the Second World War (1939–1945), Lyon was again commissioned as a second lieutenant in the Royal Artillery on 28 December 1939. He served as a Deputy Assistant Adjutant-General at the War Office until 1941, when he was given command of a light anti-aircraft artillery regiment. After the war he moved to Kenya, where he was appointed a Resident Magistrate in 1945. He next became Chief Justice of the Seychelles in 1948, serving until 1957 when he was appointed a puisne judge of the Ugandan High Court. In July 1954 a petition signed by a number of leading residents of the Seychelles, asking that Lyon not be appointed for a third term, and making various allegations about his conduct, was sent to the Secretary of State for the Colonies, Alan Lennox-Boyd in London. Lennox-Boyd decided there was no case to answer, but the petition caused considerable debate in the House of Commons in July and August 1956. Lyon served in Uganda until 1961, when he retired to the United Kingdom. He died at Hastings on 17 February 1964. He had been married twice. In addition to his cricketing and legal careers, he composed music for revues organised by André Charlot.

== Family ==
Lyon's younger brother, Beverley Hamilton Lyon, known as Bev, played for Oxford University and Gloucestershire. The brothers were on opposing sides in the 1922 Varsity match. And in 1930, in the match between Somerset and Gloucestershire at Taunton, Dar scored 210 after being dropped twice by Tom Goddard, but Bev replied with a century of his own and led his side to victory by eight wickets.

On 9 May 1928, Lyon married Helen Alice Earle (née Elliot), who had been divorced earlier that year by Lyon's Somerset cricket colleague Guy Earle, whose second wife she had been. Helen Lyon was born in 1899 and died in 1967. They had one daughter, named Elizabeth Helen Lyon.

His family were of Jewish origin.

== See also ==
- List of select Jewish cricketers

== Bibliography ==
- Foot, David (1986). Sunshine, Sixes and Cider: The History of Somerset Cricket (1986 ed.). David & Charles. ISBN 0-7153-8890-8.
- Lawrence, Eddie (March 2001). Somerset County Cricket Club (100 Greats) (2001 ed.). Tempus Publishing. ISBN 0-7524-2178-6.
