= Les Ames =

English cricketer (1905–1990)

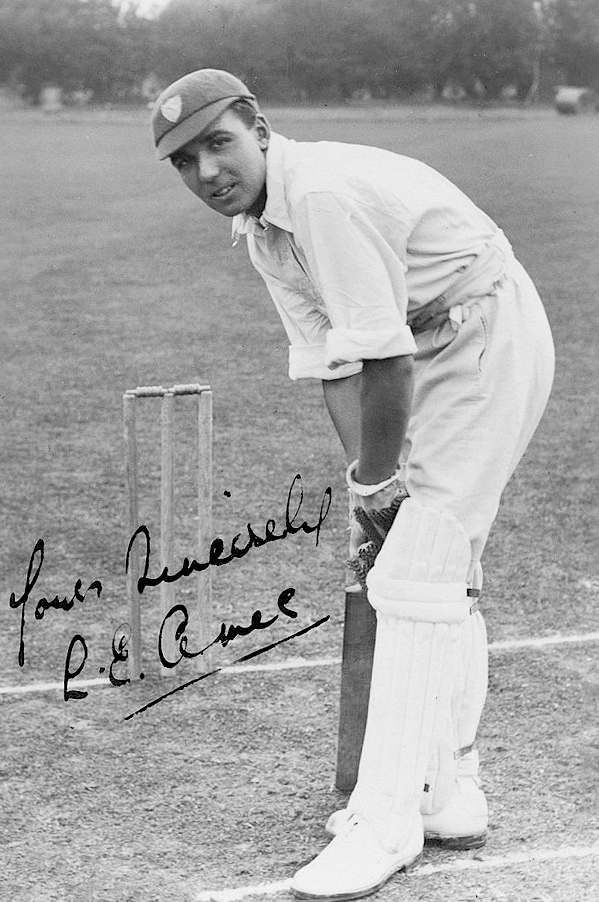
- Ames in about 1930

Personal information
- Full name: Leslie Ethelbert George Ames
- Born: 3 December 1905; Elham, Kent, England
- Died: 27 February 1990 (aged 84); Canterbury, Kent, England
- Batting: Right-handed
- Bowling: Legbreak
- Role: Wicket-keeper

International information
- National side: England
- Test debut (cap 244): 17 August 1929 v South Africa
- Last Test: 3 March 1939 v South Africa

Domestic team information
- Years: Team
- 1926–1951: Kent

Career statistics
Competition	Test	First-class
Matches	47	593
Runs scored	2,434	37,248
Batting average	40.56	43.51
100s/50s	8/7	102/176
Top score	149	295
Balls bowled	–	1,383
Wickets	–	24
Bowling average	–	33.37
5 wickets in innings	–	0
10 wickets in match	–	0
Best bowling	–	3/23
Catches/stumpings	74/23	703/418
- Source: CricInfo, 11 June 2012

Leslie Ethelbert George Ames CBE (3 December 1905 – 27 February 1990) was an English cricketer and footballer. He was a wicket-keeper and batsman for the England cricket team and Kent County Cricket Club.

Born at Elham, Kent, Ames began his first-class career with his home county of Kent in 1926, and was a regular player until the 1950s. Ames played 45 tests for England, and was part of the England squad that won the ashes in the infamous bodyline series of 1932–33. In his obituary, Wisden described him as the greatest wicket-keeper-batsman of all time. He is the only wicket-keeper-batsman to score a hundred first-class centuries, and was a Wisden cricketer of the year in 1928.

== Early career ==
Born in Elham, Kent, in 1905, he was mentored by Francis MacKinnon, an ex-county player who lived in the village and then, after leaving the Harvey Grammar School, Folkestone, by Gerry Weigall, the Kent county coach, who encouraged him to learn to keep wicket so he would have a better chance of playing for the county.

He received the call to play for Kent while playing in West Malling and made his debut for the county on 7 July 1926 against Warwickshire at the Nevill Ground in Royal Tunbridge Wells. He scored 35 and took four catches, despite not playing as a wicket-keeper in the match. He played one more County Championship match that season before becoming a regular in the 1927 season.

He went on the 1928–29 England tour of Australia, but only played in state matches. He made his debut for England in the Fifth Test against South Africa at The Oval on 17 August 1929, making a duck and taking two catches. His cap number for England is 244.

== Cricket career ==
In Test cricket, Ames played 47 matches, scoring 2,434 runs with a batting average of 40.56. He took 74 catches and made 23 stumpings. In first-class cricket, he scored 37,248 runs at an average of 43.51, including 102 centuries and 176 fifties, and took 704 catches and 417 stumpings. Unusually for a wicket-keeper, he also bowled over 200 overs, taking 24 first-class wickets with a bowling average of 33.37.

Ames was one of the Wisden Cricketers of the Year in 1929. He holds a number of wicket-keeping and batting records:

- the most dismissals in an English county cricket season (127 in 1929);
- the most stumpings in an English season (64 in 1932);
- 1000 runs and 100 dismissals in each of three seasons (1928, 1929, 1932), a feat that has only been achieved once again in county cricket;
- the only wicket-keeper to score 100 first-class centuries;
- in 1934 he was the last Englishman to score 100 or more runs before lunch in a Test match until Ian Bell did so seventy years later. Ames scored 120 runs in the session which is a record for most runs before lunch in Test cricket;
- centuries against every English first-class county, apart from his own county, Kent;
- the record 8th wicket partnership for England in Test cricket: 246 with Gubby Allen against New Zealand at Lord's in 1931. This record was finally broken by Jonathan Trott and Stuart Broad in 2010 when they scored 332 runs;
- the first wicket-keeper to score a century batting at number seven in Test Cricket.

After his final playing season in 1951, Ames became a successful manager and administrator. He managed MCC tours to the West Indies in 1967/68 when he deemed in his post-tour report that Basil D'Oliveira was a 'bad tourist' who did not adjust well to overseas conditions, spent much of his time partying, and generally detracted from team morale. This had it has been argued some role in justifying the original non-selection of D'Oliveira for the 1968/9 tour to South Africa. When that tour was cancelled he managed the subsequent replacement visit to Sri Lanka and Pakistan in 1968/69. In 1950 he had been the first professional to be appointed as a Test selector, continuing until 1956 and serving again in 1958. He was the secretary and manager of Kent County Cricket Club, including when the side won the County Championship in 1970.

In August 1957, Ames formed an invitation team to play the touring West Indies at the Hastings Festival. The match was billed as L. E. G. Ames' XI v West Indians. Ames' team included Denis Compton, Colin Cowdrey, Jack Robertson, George Tribe and John Murray. Cowdrey scored 143 on the first day but West Indies won by 4 wickets.

== Outside cricket ==
Ames joined football club Clapton Orient in 1926 making his League debut against Preston North End in January 1927 and a total of 14 senior appearances in five seasons, before briefly playing for Gillingham in 1931, where he made five appearances and scored one goal. His cricketing career was interrupted by the Second World War, during which Ames served with the Royal Air Force rising to the rank of Squadron Leader. He returned to play as a batsman for Kent after the war.
