= Marvin Borowsky =

American novelist

- Born: Marvin Sidney Borowsky; September 28, 1907; Atco, New Jersey, U.S.
- Died: July 5, 1969 (aged 61); Los Angeles, California, U.S.
- Resting place: Hillside Memorial Park
- Occupations: Novelist, screenwriter
- Spouse: Maxine Levy (m. 1931)
- Children: 2

Marvin Borowsky (September 28, 1907 – July 5, 1969) was an American novelist and a screenwriter of movies for RKO Studios, Columbia Pictures, Warner Brothers, 20th Century Fox, and others.

== Early life and career ==
Marvin Sidney Borowsky was born on September 28, 1907, in the Atco neighborhood of Waterford Township, New Jersey. His parents were Abraham Borowsky and Rae Borowsky (née Friedman). During his early years, he grew up in Waterford Township; and later in Philadelphia, Pennsylvania. After finishing his schooling, Borowsky entered as an English major at Lehigh University. However, his passion lay in the arts, specifically the theater. This led to him direct plays during his summer vacations and under his direction, "the Arden Theater developed into a highly successful professional theater."

When he finished his bachelor's degree in 1929, Borowsky went to the Yale School of Drama (since renamed as the David Geffen School of Drama at Yale University) and majored in play writing for two years. Then, he moved to New York, where he worked in different jobs throughout the years such as special lightning consultant, play reader and stage manager. In addition, "he wrote and sold two plays". "While impatiently awaiting their production, he developed an interest in writing for motion pictures, and fed up with the procrastination of New York producers, he and his wife went to Hollywood" in 1940.

== Later career ==
The two plays he sold in New York were never produced, but it did lead for him to get his first job at MGM Studios as a screenwriter. In the following years, he wrote around seven screenplays for different studios. Moreover, he also helped other screenwriters solve "their script problems", which led him to the decision of wanting to teach others "the art of screenwriting." Borowsky first "lectured on play writing" at the University of Southern California and then joined the "UCLA's Theater Arts Department as professor of creating writing" in 1961.

In addition, Borowsky was "a member of the board of directors of the Writers Guild of America and the Motion Picture Relief Fund" for many years. Aside from being a screenwriter, he was also a novelist as he wrote an Arthurian novel titled The Queen's Knight in 1955; and he was a "talented painter" whose art works were exhibited in several museums in California. On 1968, Borowsky took a sabbatical and traveled throughout Europe and Israel. During that period of time, he gathered material for a book he was writing, did interviews and lectured in "at the Tel Aviv Screen Center, and acting as a consultant to Israeli screenwriters."

== Personal life and death ==
In 1931, Borowsky married Maxine Levy, and they had a daughter and a son.

Borowsky died on July 5, 1969, in Los Angeles, California after a "two-month illness."

== Works ==
=== Screenplays ===
- Free and Easy (1941)
- Reunion in France (1942)
- Escape in the Desert (1945)
- Pride of the Marines (1945)
- Somewhere in the Night (1946)
- Big Jack (1949)
- Gambling House (1950)

=== Novels ===
- The Queen's Knight (1955)
