= Dallas Page (cricketer) =

English cricketer

Personal information
- Full name: Dallas Alexander Chancellor Page
- Born: 11 April 1911; Montpellier, Cheltenham, Gloucestershire
- Died: 2 September 1936 (aged 25); Cirencester, Gloucestershire
- Batting: Right-handed
- Relatives: Herbert Page (father)

Domestic team information
- Years: Team
- 1933–1936: Gloucestershire

Career statistics
Competition	First-class
Matches	106
Runs scored	2,993
Batting average	18.70
100s/50s	1/11
Top score	116
Balls bowled	81
Wickets	0
Bowling average	–
5 wickets in innings	–
10 wickets in match	–
Best bowling	–
Catches/stumpings	75/0
- Source: , 1 August 2014

Dallas Alexander Chancellor Page (11 April 1911 – 2 September 1936) was a cricketer who played for and captained Gloucestershire. He was the son of the Oxford University and Gloucestershire cricketer Herbert Page. He was born in Cheltenham, Gloucestershire and died at Cirencester, also in Gloucestershire.

Page was a right-handed middle order batsman and a brilliant cover fieldsman, and played fairly regularly for Gloucestershire in County Championship matches in 1934, having made his debut the previous year. When the successful Bev Lyon stood down from the captaincy after six seasons at the end of 1934, Page, as the only regular amateur player in the side, was picked to succeed him for 1935.

Page's first season as captain was not a success, and Wisden put some of the responsibility for a drop to 15th in the Championship on Page's inexperienced handling of a bowling attack that was in transition following the retirement of Charlie Parker. In 1936, however, Gloucestershire's rise to fourth in the final table was also due in part, Wisden said, to Page's enthusiasm and team-building.

Page himself was a modest performer, with a career average of less than 20. He scored 1,000 runs in a season once only, in 1935, and made only one century.

He was killed in a car crash near his home at Cirencester while returning from the final match of the 1936 season, where he had led his side to victory over Nottinghamshire at the Wagon Works Ground, Gloucester, and had taken the catch that finished the match.
