= Ken Graveney =

English cricketer

John Kenneth Richard "Ken" Graveney (16 December 1924 – 25 October 2015) was an English first-class cricketer from Hexham, Northumberland, who played for and captained Gloucestershire.

Graveney was a lower order left-handed batsman and a right-arm fast-medium bowler of outswingers. He played in a few matches for Gloucestershire in both 1947 and 1948, and then regularly in 1949, when he took 59 wickets, including all ten wickets in an innings, for 66 runs, against Derbyshire at Chesterfield, the second-best innings analysis in the county's history. He played less in 1950 and 1951, however, because of fitness problems with a slipped disc, and this back trouble forced him to retire from first-class cricket after the 1951 season.

In 1962, he reappeared in a few second eleven matches and, on the resignation as county captain of Tom Pugh at the end of that season Graveney was appointed to lead the county side in 1963 and 1964. With a talented side of bowling all-rounders, including the England players David Smith, John Mortimore and David Allen, Graveney bowled very little and at a very gentle medium pace and batted low down the order. The side finished eighth in 1963, but he retired as captain after a notably unsuccessful season in 1964 when Gloucestershire finished at the bottom of the County Championship.

In retirement, Graveney was active in committee work at Gloucestershire, serving as Chairman of the General Committee.

His brother Tom and his son David both had long cricket careers with Gloucestershire, and both captained the county.

On 25 October 2015, he died at his home in Tyler, Texas, aged 90. His brother Tom died nine days later, on 3 November.
