= Tom Pugh (cricketer) =

English cricketer

Personal information
- Full name: Charles Thomas Michael Pugh
- Born: 13 March 1937; Marylebone, London, England
- Died: 1 February 2016 (aged 78); Putney, Surrey, England
- Batting: Right-handed
- Bowling: Right-arm slow-medium

Domestic team information
- Years: Team
- 1959–1962: Gloucestershire

Career statistics
Competition	First-class
Matches	80
Runs scored	2469
Batting average	18.56
100s/50s	1/8
Top score	137
Balls bowled	54
Wickets	1
Bowling average	30.00
5 wickets in innings	0
10 wickets in match	0
Best bowling	1/12
Catches/stumpings	42/0
- Source: Cricinfo, 22 January 2022

Charles Thomas Michael Pugh (13 March 1937 – 1 February 2016) was an English cricketer who captained Gloucestershire County Cricket Club. He was also arguably, for almost half a century, the best doubles rackets player in the world.

Contrary to popular belief, he did not run a nightclub. He did own Ace Sauna on the Kings Road, which was one of the first place to have sports massages, with the then current English Judo champion one of his regulars. However it was raided by the police and as a result was charged with "keeping or managing a brothel", but was acquitted.

== Life ==
He was born close to Lord's and was educated at Eton. His father was Micheal Arthur Pugh of the Atco Motor Mower Company; his mother, Mary Elizabeth Ekersley of the cotton mill family in Manchester, was an international ice hockey player.

Whilst doing his National Service and serving on HMS Adamant, he suffered a breakdown and was taken to a mental hospital in Portsmouth.

He created and ran the massage and sauna parlour Ace Sauna in Chelsea, formerly a closed down gay club, which was raided by the police and exposed by the News of the World. He was charged under the Sexual Offences Act, but was found not guilty with the polices' affidavit proven to be 90% factually incorrect. He had previously run a successful flower business with 3 shops and a garden construction company, Pugh & Carr in central London. They served Ava Gardner and provided the bouquet that Margaret Thatcher held as she was received at 10 Donwing St after her successful election. He imported JVC karaoke machines, kicking off the genre in the UK and ran karaoke sing-a-long evenings in both Florida and London, under the slogan - At last your chance to murder Barry Manilow. And for almost 30 years ran Londons most successful video games businesses, Tom Pugh's Leisure Company.

In the early 1960s he was short-listed to be the first actor to play James Bond, having come to the attention of the producers through having appeared in television cigarette advertisements, but Sean Connery was preferred. His first wife, the model Kitty Ruth Green, voted South Africas 2nd most beautiful women of the 20th century, also had a James Bond connection, in 1965 having a small part in Thunderball.

His second wife was Misty Romaine Ramsawak, from Trinidad and Tobago. He had two sons by his first wife, Thomas and Bobby and a daughter, Annabel, by his second.

== Cricket ==
Tom Pugh was a right-handed batsman who played in 80 first-class matches between 1959 and 1962, including 76 for Gloucestershire whom he captained in 1961 and 1962. He shared a record second-wicket stand for Gloucestershire of 256 with Tom Graveney versus Derbyshire at Chesterfield in 1960, scoring 137. In the 1960 season as a whole, he scored 1,011 runs at an average of 21.51.

At the end of the 1960 season, Pugh, whose batting according to The Daily Telegraph "hardly surpassed old Etonian standards" was controversially appointed captain of Gloucestershire. According to the Times, Graveney, whom he replaced, was not forewarned; the change was made because professionals were not regarded as suitable leaders. Graveney promptly resigned and joined Worcestershire.

Pugh's first season as captain in 1961 was spoilt by injury: he broke his jaw and missed 18 games. He ducked into a full toss from David Larter and not only suffered a broken jaw but was also given out lbw for a duck.

In April 1962, Pugh organised a tour to Bermuda during which the county played a soccer match against the island team with Stanley Matthews guesting for Gloucestershire. On the three-week tour the county team played ten cricket matches against local teams.

Pugh played in every match in 1962, but his batting returns were modest, and he averaged only 15 in County Championship matches. He was sacked from the captaincy at the end of the 1962 season, despite the fact that Gloucestershire finished fourth in the table and won nine out of the last 15 matches. Gloucestershire won 14 matches under Pugh's captaincy in that season. They have never won as many matches in a season since.

He was bitter about his sacking, and refused to attend reunions of former players.

He was a nephew of the former Lancashire captain Peter Eckersley, and also of John Pugh who played for Warwickshire. He represented Middlesex Young Cricketers and was recommended to Gloucestershire by Percy Fender.

== Rackets ==
In rackets, Pugh won the Public Schools Doubles for Eton in 1955 with Lord Chelsea, and was runner up in the Amateur Singles in 1967 and 1970.

He won the Noel Bruce Cup (Old Boys Doubles) for Eton six times between 1962 and 1986 with James Leonard (1962, 1963 and 1965), David Norman (1964) and Willie Boone (1984 and 1986). With Willie Boone he also won the Amateur Doubles in 1975, 1976 and 1977, having first won it with JR Thompson in 1966. He won the Combined Services Past and Present Singles in 1959, 1961 and 1965, and dominated the doubles for many years, winning with Lieutenant Commander Peter Kershaw (1958 and 1959), his brother Tim (1963, 1967 and 1972) and Geoffrey Atkins (1976, 1982, 1983 and 1984).
