= Philip Williams (cricketer, born 1884) =

English cricketer

Personal information
- Full name: Philip Francis Cunningham Williams
- Born: 6 July 1884; Kensington, London
- Died: 6 May 1958 (aged 73); Westminster, London
- Batting: Right-handed
- Relatives: John Williams (brother)

Domestic team information
- Years: Team
- 1919-1925: Gloucestershire
- Source: Cricinfo, 27 March 2014

Philip Williams (6 July 1884 – 6 May 1958) was an English cricketer. He played for Gloucestershire between 1919 and 1925. He captained Gloucestershire in 1922 and 1923.
