= Martin Young (cricketer) =

English cricketer

Personal information
- Born: 15 April 1924; Coalville, Leicestershire, England
- Died: 18 June 1993 (aged 69); Cape Town, South Africa
- Batting: Right-handed
- Bowling: Right-arm slow

Career statistics
Competition	First-class	List A
Matches	475	2
Runs scored	24,555	22
Batting average	30.69	11.00
100s/50s	40/113	0/0
Top score	198	21
Balls bowled	208	–
Wickets	4	–
Bowling average	43.00	–
5 wickets in innings	0	–
10 wickets in match	0	–
Best bowling	2/35	–
Catches/stumpings	178/–	1/–
- Source: CricketArchive, 12 April 2023

Douglas Martin Young (15 April 1924 – 18 June 1993) was an English first-class cricketer who played for Gloucestershire and Worcestershire. He was a right-handed opening batsman.

Young played for Worcestershire from 1946 to 1948, then for Gloucestershire from 1949 to 1964. He scored 23,400 runs in his career with Gloucestershire, including 40 hundreds. His most prolific year came in 1959 when he managed 2090 runs. It was the second time that he had passed 2000 runs in a season, having also done so in 1955. In 1962 he put on 395 with Ronald Nicholls against Oxford University which remains the highest first-class opening stand by Gloucestershire; Young made his highest first-class score of 198.

After his playing career ended he emigrated to South Africa, where he appeared regularly on radio as a cricket commentator.
