= David Smith (Gloucestershire cricketer) =

English cricketer

Personal information
- Full name: David Robert Smith
- Born: 5 October 1934; Fishponds, Bristol, England
- Died: 17 December 2003 (aged 69); Bristol, England
- Batting: Right-handed
- Bowling: Right-arm medium-fast

International information
- National side: England
- Test debut: 11 November 1961 v India
- Last Test: 10 January 1962 v India

Career statistics
Competition	Test	First-class
Matches	5	386
Runs scored	38	4,966
Batting average	9.50	12.32
100s/50s	0/0	0/6
Top score	34	74
Balls bowled	972	72,581
Wickets	6	1,250
Bowling average	59.83	23.72
5 wickets in innings	0	51
10 wickets in match	0	6
Best bowling	2/60	7/20
Catches/stumpings	2/–	294/–
- Source: CricInfo, 7 November 2022
Association football career
- Position: Left winger
Senior career*
Years	Team	Apps	(Gls)
1953–1959	Bristol City	21	(1)
1959–1960	Millwall	13	(1)
Total		34	(2)
International career
- England youth
- * Club domestic league appearances and goals

David Smith (5 October 1934 – 17 December 2003) was an English cricketer, who played in five Tests for England in India in 1961–1962.

He was one of a trio of pace bowlers, along with Alan Brown and Butch White, who were given their opportunity on the eight Test, five-month tour of India and Pakistan. However, his efforts in the heat and dust of the Indian subcontinent, did not do sufficient to earn him a chance to bowl in an England Test series at home.

== Life and career ==
Smith was born in Fishponds, Bristol.

He was a lower-order right-handed batsman, and a medium-fast right-arm bowler, who played for Gloucestershire for fifteen seasons from 1956, usually opening the bowling in partnership with Tony Brown. He was a successful county bowler at slightly above medium-pace, able to move the ball off the seam in both directions, and in five seasons he took more than 100 wickets, with a best of 143 wickets in 1960. In a team that was packed with all-rounders, Smith tended to bat fairly low, but he occasionally made useful runs, often in a fairly forthright style.

Smith's only Test cricket came on the long, and by modern standards, arduous Marylebone Cricket Club (MCC) tour that started in Pakistan, moved on to India, took in Sri Lanka and then returned to Pakistan, in 1961–62. Leading England fast bowlers such as Fred Trueman and Brian Statham opted out of the tour, and Smith was one of three seam bowlers whose only experience of Test cricket came on the tour. Smith played in only the five Indian Tests, missing the three in Pakistan, and took six wickets in a series dominated by spin bowling. The regular Test fast bowlers resumed their careers in the 1962 English season, and Smith was never selected again.

Smith was also a footballer who played at outside-left for Bristol City and Millwall.

David Smith died in Bristol in December 2003, at the age of 69.
