= Ron Nicholls (English sportsman) =

English sportsman

Cricket information
- Batting: Right-handed
- Bowling: Right-arm off-break

Career statistics
Competition	First-class	List A
Matches	534	87
Runs scored	23,607	1,740
Batting average	26.17	21.21
100s/50s	18/124	1/10
Top score	217	127
Balls bowled	1,166	6
Wickets	11	1
Bowling average	65.36	4.00
5 wickets in innings	0	0
10 wickets in match	0	0
Best bowling	2/19	1/4
Catches/stumpings	285/1	12/–
- Source: CricketArchive, 12 April 2023

Ronald Bernard Nicholls (4 December 1933 – 22 July 1994) was an English first-class cricketer who played for Gloucestershire.

In a game in 1962 against Oxford University he opened the batting with Martin Young and they put on 395 runs. The partnership remains the highest for any wicket by Gloucestershire and Nicholls made his career best score of 217. He finished the year with 2,059 runs. He also kept wicket in some John Player League games.

Nicholls also played football playing in goal for Bristol Rovers, Cardiff City, Bristol City and Cheltenham Town making a total of 161 league appearances.
