= Bev Lyon =

English cricketer (1902–1970)

Personal information
- Full name: Beverley Hamilton Lyon
- Born: 19 January 1902; Caterham, Surrey, England
- Died: 22 June 1970 (aged 68); Balcombe, Sussex, England
- Batting: Right-handed
- Role: Batsman, captain
- Relatives: Dar Lyon (brother)

Career statistics
Competition	First-class
Matches	267
Runs scored	10,694
Batting average	24.98
100s/50s	16/49
Top score	189
Balls bowled	3,546
Wickets	52
Bowling average	45.01
5 wickets in innings	1
10 wickets in match	0
Best bowling	5/72
Catches/stumpings	266/–
- Source: ESPNcricinfo, 7 July 2019

Beverley Hamilton Lyon (19 January 1902 – 22 June 1970) was an English cricketer who played for Oxford University and Gloucestershire. He was a bespectacled middle-order batsman and a fine close fielder who held forthright and, for his time, outspoken views on cricket captaincy and cricket traditions and who was given full rein by his county, Gloucestershire, to express his views as captain for six years from 1929.

== Biography ==
Some of Lyon's views – on Sunday cricket and on a knockout cup, for instance – were by some distance too far ahead of their time. But in 1931, he was involved in a "rule-bending" match against Yorkshire at Sheffield in which, after two rain-ruined days, he and the Yorkshire captain agreed to declare their counties' first innings after one ball had been bowled to bring about a result on the second innings. The rules were changed for the following season to allow for a one-innings match in similar circumstances.

Lyon and his partner brought Gloucestershire cricketing success. In 1929 and 1930, they won more matches than any other county; in 1930 and 1931, they finished second. Lyon was aided, no doubt, by having Wally Hammond, one of England's finest batsman of the time, at his side. And the three years of success coincided as well with the last years of the slow left-arm bowler Charlie Parker and the first years of Parker's successor, the off break bowler Tom Goddard. But the captaincy of Lyon was regarded as a vital factor, and he was chosen as a Wisden Cricketer of the Year in 1931. The citation in Wisden suggested that he might be a future captain of England, but that did not happen.

Lyon's Gloucestershire career began in 1921; he also won a Blue at Oxford in 1922 and 1923. He resigned from the Gloucestershire captaincy after three more moderate years from 1932 to 1934, but played intermittently until 1947. He had also played Minor Counties cricket for Wiltshire in 1920.

Lyon's older brother, Malcolm Douglas Lyon, known as Dar, played for Cambridge University and Somerset. The brothers were on opposing sides in the 1922 Varsity match. And in 1930, in the match between Somerset and Gloucestershire at Taunton, Dar scored 210 after being dropped twice by Goddard, but Bev replied with a century of his own and led his side to victory by eight wickets.

== See also ==
- List of select Jewish cricketers
