= Cyril Sewell =

South African cricketer

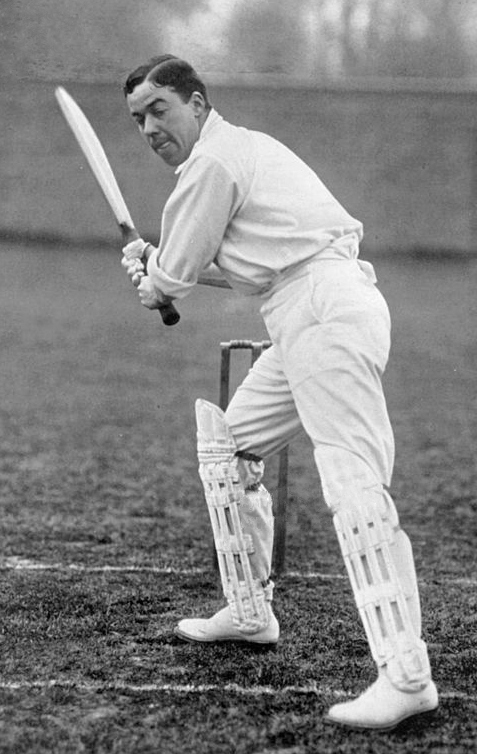

Personal information
- Full name: Cyril Otto Hudson Sewell
- Born: 19 December 1874; Pietermaritzburg, Colony of Natal
- Died: 19 August 1951 (aged 76); Bexhill-on-Sea, Sussex, England
- Nickname: Skilly
- Batting: Right-handed
- Bowling: Right-arm slow
- Relatives: JJ Sewell (father)

Domestic team information
- Years: Team
- 1895–1919: Gloucestershire
- 1896–1912: Marylebone Cricket Club

Career statistics
Competition	First-class
Matches	173
Runs scored	7,562
Batting average	26.07
100s/50s	9/34
Top score	165
Balls bowled	403
Wickets	5
Bowling average	61.60
5 wickets in innings	0
10 wickets in match	0
Best bowling	2/35
Catches/stumpings	118/–
- Source: CricketArchive, 16 November 2012

Cyril Otto Hudson Sewell (19 December 1874 – 19 August 1951) was a Natal-born English first-class cricketer who played for Gloucestershire and the Marylebone Cricket Club between 1895 and 1919.

== Cricket career ==
A right-handed batsman, Sewell could open the batting or play lower in the order, as required. The majority of his 173 first-class appearances were made for Gloucestershire, who he captained in the two years prior to the First World War.

At the age of 19, he was part of the South African side which toured England in 1894. On the tour, Sewell was the leading run-scorer for the tourists, accruing 1,038 runs at an average of 30.52, although none of the matches were considered to be first-class. He moved to England the following year and made his Gloucestershire debut in May 1895. He scored his maiden century the following season against Nottinghamshire, scoring 104 runs in the second innings. He scored over 1,000 runs in a season for the first of two occasions in 1898, accruing 1,114 runs at an average of 33.75. He then toured North America as part of Pelham Warner's side in late 1898.

He played only occasionally for Gloucestershire between 1899 and 1912, not appearing at all in 1907, 1908 or 1911. In 1906, he achieved his highest batting average in a season, scoring his 409 runs at 45.44. He was appointed as secretary of Gloucestershire in 1912, and captain the subsequent year, taking over both positions from Gilbert Jessop. He appeared more regularly at this time, playing at least nineteen matches in each of the three years prior to the cessation of cricket due to the First World War. In 1914, he passed 1,000 runs in a second for the second and final time, scoring 1,142 runs at 26.55. He appeared only once in first-class cricket after the war, having little impact during a county match against Lancashire. Described in his Wisden obituary as a "hard-hitting, attractive batsman", Sewell scored 7,562 runs in first-class cricket at an average of 26.07, and hit nine centuries.
