= Atco Lake =

- Location within New Jersey
- Location: Waterford Township, New Jersey
- Coordinates: 39.75702°N 74.88581°W
- Type: Reservoir
- Surface area: 30 acres (0.12 km^{2})
- Surface elevation: 115 feet (35 m)

Atco Lake is a 30 acres (0.12 km^{2}) man-made lake located in the Atco section of Waterford Township, New Jersey. The lake is located within Atco Lake Park, which is 77 acres (0.31 km^{2}) and is owned by Camden County. The lake is located on U.S. Route 30 (White Horse Pike).

Atco Lake has a large population of weeds and water lilies. Some fish found in the lake include largemouth bass, pickerel and sunfish.
