= Atco, New Jersey =

Populated place in Camden County, New Jersey, US

- Census-designated place
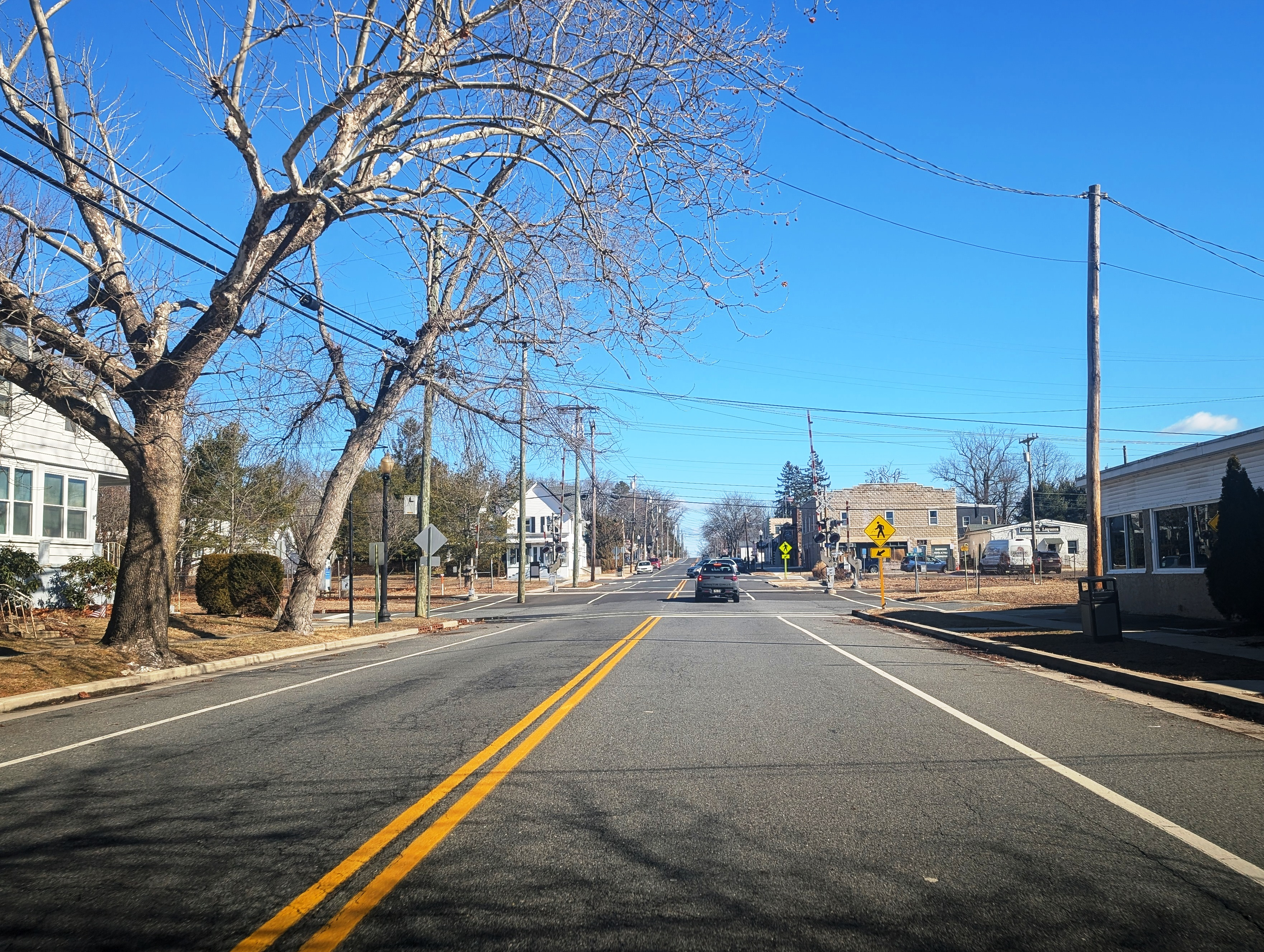
- Center of Atco along Atco Avenue

- Location in Camden County Location in New Jersey Location in the United States
- Coordinates: 39°46′11″N 74°53′15″W
- Country: United States
- State: New Jersey
- County: Camden
- Township: Waterford

Area
  - Total: 9.78 sq mi (25.32 km^{2})
  - Land: 9.69 sq mi (25.09 km^{2})
  - Water: 0.089 sq mi (0.23 km^{2})
- Elevation: 148 ft (45 m)

Population (2020 census)
  - Total: 9,058
- Time zone: UTC−05:00 (Eastern (EST))
  - Summer (DST): UTC−04:00 (Eastern (EDT))
- ZIP Code: 08004
- Area code: 856
- FIPS code: 34-02020
- GNIS feature ID: 2806228

Atco is an unincorporated community and census-designated place (CDP) in Waterford Township in Camden County, in the U.S. state of New Jersey. It is part of the Philadelphia-Camden metropolitan area, located 16 miles (26 km) southeast of Camden. Though generally considered part of Waterford Township, a small section of the southern edge of Atco is located in Winslow Township.

Atco was first listed as a CDP prior to the 2020 census with a population of 9,058.

Atco was the home of the Atco Raceway, and served as the location for the movie Eddie and the Cruisers. In 2005, an episode of Viva La Bam was shot at the raceway. The area is served as United States Postal Service ZIP Code 08004.

== History ==
Atco's name originates from the Atlantic Transport Company, although alternative origins have been proposed, including an indigenous term meaning "Land of many deer." The Atlantic Transport Company of West Virginia placed a substantial order for four large ships with the New York Shipbuilding Corporation, located in Camden, New Jersey, between 1902 and 1903. This event may have contributed to the adoption of the name "Atco" around that time.

Camden and Atlantic Railroad was founded in 1854; it crossed the Pinelands from Camden to Atlantic City. The Raritan and Delaware Bay Railroad was established soon after, linking Atco to communities such as Toms River, Waretown, Atsion and Vineland.

The story of the Atco Ghost is popular in Atco. Legend has it that a young boy was killed by a drunk driver while chasing a ball, and his ghost can now be seen playing on Burnt Mill Road, the same street where the accident occurred, after a motorist honks their horn.

== Geography ==
The town is at the western edge of Wharton State Forest and the Pine Barrens. Atco Lake is a 30 acres (12 ha) lake in Atco.

=== Climate ===
The climate in this area is characterized by hot, humid summers and generally mild to cool winters. According to the Köppen Climate Classification system, Atco has a humid subtropical climate, abbreviated "Cfa" on climate maps.

== Education ==
Atco was the site of Assumption School, an elementary school that operated under the auspices of the Roman Catholic Diocese of Camden until it was closed at the end of the 2012–13 school year.

Atco public schools, operated by Waterford Township School District, serve K-6 grade. Atco Elementary (grades to K-1), Thomas Richards Elementary (grades 2–3) and Waterford Elementary (grades 4–6) serve students from Atco. Junior high school and high school students from Atco are served by Hammonton Public Schools or parochial schools of their choice.

== Transportation ==
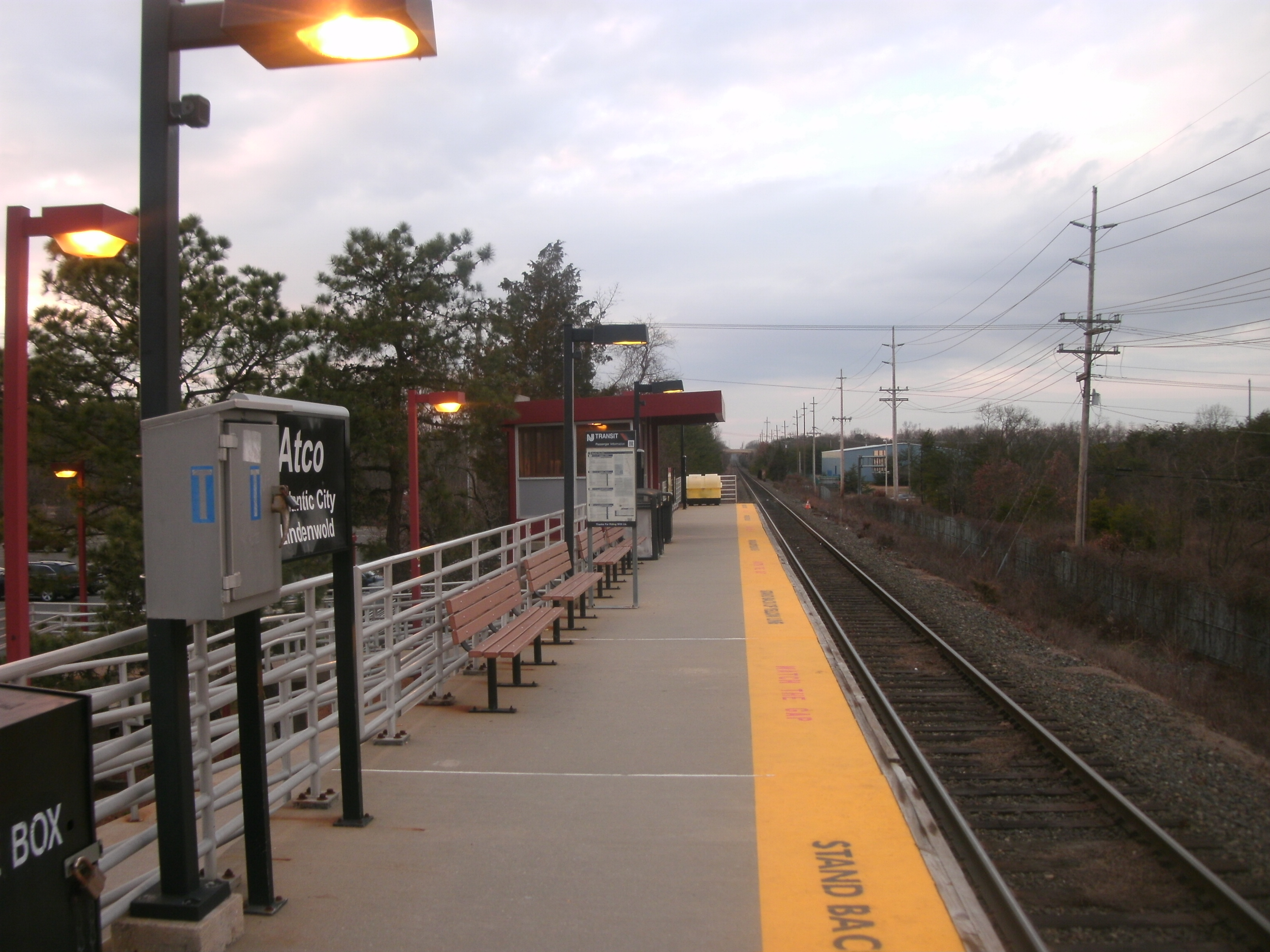
Atco station, which is served by NJ Transit's Atlantic City Line

Atco has a train station on the Atlantic City Line, which is operated by NJ Transit. The station is accessible from Route 73 and the White Horse Pike (U.S. Route 30).

== Demographics ==
Historical population
Census	Pop.	Note	%±
2020	9,058		—
U.S. Decennial Census; 2020

Atco first appeared as a census designated place in the 2020 U.S. census.

=== 2020 census ===
As of the 2020 census, Atco had a population of 9,058. The median age was 43.0 years. 19.8% of residents were under the age of 18 and 18.1% of residents were 65 years of age or older. For every 100 females there were 101.4 males, and for every 100 females age 18 and over there were 98.7 males age 18 and over.

95.9% of residents lived in urban areas, while 4.1% lived in rural areas.

There were 3,270 households in Atco, of which 31.9% had children under the age of 18 living in them. Of all households, 56.2% were married-couple households, 16.0% were households with a male householder and no spouse or partner present, and 20.4% were households with a female householder and no spouse or partner present. About 19.7% of all households were made up of individuals and 8.6% had someone living alone who was 65 years of age or older.

There were 3,397 housing units, of which 3.7% were vacant. The homeowner vacancy rate was 1.5% and the rental vacancy rate was 3.8%.

Atco CDP, New Jersey – Racial and ethnic composition Note: the US Census treats Hispanic/Latino as an ethnic category. This table excludes Latinos from the racial categories and assigns them to a separate category. Hispanics/Latinos may be of any race.
Race / Ethnicity (NH = Non-Hispanic)	Pop 2020	% 2020
White alone (NH)	7,511	82.92%
Black or African American alone (NH)	471	5.20%
Native American or Alaska Native alone (NH)	10	0.11%
Asian alone (NH)	128	1.41%
Native Hawaiian or Pacific Islander alone (NH)	0	0.00%
Other Race alone (NH)	43	0.47%
Mixed race or Multiracial (NH)	342	3.78%
Hispanic or Latino (any race)	553	6.11%
Total	9,058	100.00%

== Notable people ==
People who were born in, residents of, or otherwise closely associated with Atco include:

- Marvin Borowsky (1907–1969), novelist and screenwriter
- Kellyanne Conway (born 1967), strategist, and pollster who was campaign manager for Republican presidential candidate Donald Trump in 2016.
- Rey Ramsey (born 1960), social justice entrepreneur, author and former CEO of the One Economy Corporation.
- Jimmy "Superfly" Snuka (1943–2017), former professional wrestler born in Fiji.
- Sally Starr (1923–2013), 1950s celebrity television personality.
