= Tom Graveney =

English cricketer

Tom Graveney OBE
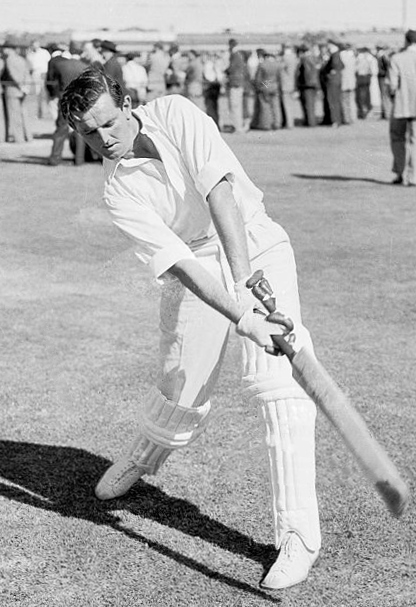
- Tom Graveney in 1954

Personal information
- Full name: Thomas William Graveney
- Born: 16 June 1927; Riding Mill, Hexham, Northumberland, England
- Died: 3 November 2015 (aged 88)
- Nickname: Long Tom
- Batting: Right-handed
- Bowling: Right-arm leg break
- Role: Batsman
- Relatives: Ken Graveney (brother); David Graveney (nephew)

International information
- National side: England
- Test debut (cap 358): 5 July 1951 v South Africa
- Last Test: 12 June 1969 v West Indies

Domestic team information
- Years: Team
- 1948–1960: Gloucestershire
- 1961–1970: Worcestershire
- 1969/70–1971/72: Queensland

Career statistics
Competition	Test	FC	LA
Matches	79	732	45
Runs scored	4,882	47,793	1,147
Batting average	44.38	44.91	31.86
100s/50s	11/20	122/233	0/6
Top score	258	258	98
Balls bowled	260	5,479	–
Wickets	1	80	–
Bowling average	167.00	37.96	–
5 wickets in innings	0	1	–
10 wickets in match	0	0	–
Best bowling	1/34	5/28	–
Catches/stumpings	80/–	553/1	15/–
- Source: CricketArchive, 25 January 2009

Thomas William Graveney OBE (16 June 1927 – 3 November 2015) was an English first-class cricketer, representing his country in 79 Test matches and scoring over 4,800 runs. In a career lasting from 1948 to 1972, he became the 15th player to score one hundred first-class centuries; he was the first batsman beginning his career after the Second World War to reach this milestone. He played for Gloucestershire and Worcestershire, and helped Worcestershire win the county championship for the first time in their history. His achievements for England after being recalled in 1966 have been described as "the stuff of legend." Graveney was a Wisden Cricketer of the Year in 1953, captained England on one occasion and was awarded the OBE while still playing.

His international career ended at the age of 42 when he played in a benefit match on the rest day of a Test match. He was banned for three matches, and was never selected for England again. In later life he worked as a cricket commentator for BBC Television and was the first former professional to be President of the Marylebone Cricket Club. He was one of the first 55 players inducted to the ICC Cricket Hall of Fame in 2009.

== Early life ==
Graveney was born on 16 June 1927 in the village of Riding Mill, near Hexham, Northumberland, one of five children born to Jack and Mary Graveney. One of his two brothers was the cricketer Ken Graveney. His father worked for the armaments manufacturer Vickers Armstrong in Newcastle-upon-Tyne as an engineer. After Jack's death in 1933, Mary married another engineer. The family moved to Lancashire and, in 1938, to Bristol so that Graveney's step-father could take up a position at Avonmouth Docks.

Graveney attended Bristol Grammar School, playing cricket, hockey, rugby and golf all to a very high standard. He started work as an accountant, leaving after a few days to join the Army in 1946, as his elder brother Ken had done. He served in Suez with the Gloucestershire Regiment as a second lieutenant in 1946, and was later promoted to the rank of captain in the sports depot. At school he had been primarily a bowler, but when playing cricket on concrete pitches in Egypt with the army, he specialised more in batting, using his height and technique. On home leave in August 1947, he was asked to play in some benefit matches for Gloucestershire County Cricket Club – an invitation made at the suggestion of Ken, who was already playing as a bowler for the club. On the basis of Graveney's performances, he was offered a contract to play for the county for £200 annually and although he enjoyed life in the army, he accepted.

== Cricketing career ==
=== Gloucestershire and England ===
He played his first first-class match for Gloucestershire against Oxford University Cricket Club in April 1948 but failed to score, and did not become a regular member of the team until later in the season. He was the 12th man when the county played the touring Australian team of 1948 – known as "the Invincibles" – who scored 783 runs for 6 wickets. In the 1949 season, he scored 1,784 runs and started to be mentioned as a potential England player. At that time, selectors were having difficulty finding new batsmen to play alongside Len Hutton and Denis Compton, and tried many possibilities. After Compton had sustained an injury, Graveney was selected for the Old Trafford Test match against South Africa in 1951, scoring 15 runs. Graveney was not selected for the following Test match, but joined the 1951–52 tour of India and Pakistan after scoring 2,291 runs for Gloucestershire during the season. He scored his first Test century on this tour, taking eight hours to score 175 runs in the second Test in Bombay (after missing the first because of dysentery). By the end of the tour, he had established his place in the national team, and (in the words of The Times) was regarded as "England's outstanding young batsman", along with Peter May.

Graveney's attacking style as a batsman did not find favour with Hutton, the captain, who (in the words of one commentator) "did not want flowery batsmen but fighters" in the attempt to regain the Ashes from Australia. In the late afternoon of the Test match at Lord's in 1953, when Hutton and Graveney were in control with the score at 143 for 1 and Graveney was looking to score a century, Hutton told Graveney to stop attacking for the rest of the day and only 34 runs were scored in the last hour. Early the next morning, Graveney was dismissed by the refreshed Australian bowling attack without adding to his overnight score of 78. Nevertheless, England won the series and took the Ashes, which Australia had held since 1934. Graveney was named one of Wisden's five Cricketers of the Year for 1953.

Hutton again curbed Graveney's attacking instincts during the 1953–54 tour of the West Indies after Graveney had started by hitting successive boundaries, telling him to "grind this one out". Hutton later described Graveney as "not quite the chap for the big occasion" when Graveney's largest contribution to the 1954–55 tour of Australia was a century in the final Test match, by which point England had already won the series. He had been dropped for two matches earlier in the series after being dismissed for 0 when playing an aggressive shot when the match situation called for caution.

After a poor series against South Africa in 1955 – where he suffered a permanent injury to the little finger of his left hand when acting as substitute wicket-keeper – he was dropped midway through the 1956 tour by the Australians and was not selected for the winter tour to South Africa. Perhaps jokingly, he later put his failure to be selected for the South Africa tour to the fact that he had beaten the chairman of selectors, Gubby Allen, at a round of golf. His form in county cricket in 1957, where he was the leading run-scorer for the second successive season, prompted his recall to play the West Indies. Although he was dismissed for 0 at Lords, he scored 258 at Trent Bridge (his highest score in first-class cricket) and a further century later in the series. Poor performances in the following year and the 1958–59 tour to Australia again led to his being dropped. One Australian journalist, the former cricket Jack Fingleton, said afterwards that he did not think that Graveney's "smiling nature fits in with the seriousness of Test cricket".

=== Move to Worcestershire ===
Graveney was appointed captain of Gloucestershire in 1959, but was not suited to the job. The team finished in second place in the county championship that year, but dropped to eighth place in 1960. Discontent with his captaincy led the county to replace him after the end of the 1960 season with Tom Pugh, a less talented batsman who (according to The Times) was "a young and inexperienced amateur who was barely worth his place in the side". Graveney left Gloucestershire on discovering that it had been decided when giving the captaincy to Graveney that Pugh would be his successor. This meant that Graveney did not play first-class cricket in 1961, as Gloucestershire required him to meet the residence qualification for his new club, Worcestershire, before being allowed to play for them. His performances for Worcestershire in 1962 led to his recall to the England team, where he scored two centuries and averaged 100 in the series against Pakistan, but he failed again on the winter tour of Australia and was dropped. He helped Worcestershire win the county championship in 1964 and 1965, the first time that they had done so, and reached the landmark of one hundred first-class centuries in 1964 (the 15th person, and the first player starting his career after the Second World War, to do so).

=== Final matches for England and retirement ===
Recalled by England in 1966 against the West Indies, he scored heavily, including 165 at the Oval, aged 39, described as "arguably the best innings of his life" by one report. He later said that his England recall "came totally out of the blue" and that a West Indian supporter in the crowd shouted "Heh, Graveney, haven't they got a pension scheme in this country?" He remained in the team in the following seasons, performing well at home and on tour, and captaining England against Australia for one match in 1968 when Colin Cowdrey was unavailable. He was vice-captain for three years. He was awarded the OBE in 1968, described by one writer as a "rare distinction" for someone still playing.

His final Test match was against the West Indies in 1969. It was also his benefit season with Worcestershire. In those days, the Sunday of the Test match was a rest day, and he had arranged to play in an exhibition match in Luton ("Tom Graveney's XI v Bobby Simpson's XI"), a match that earned him £1,000. For comparison, his salary from Worcestershire in 1966 was £850. He was banned for three matches as a result, as the chairman of the selectors Alec Bedser stated that he had told Graveney before the Test match not to play in the Sunday game. Graveney said that he had told Bedser before being chosen for the Test match that he was committed to the Luton game, but to no avail. He continued to play for Worcestershire, captaining the team from 1968 to 1970, and had the second-highest batting average in the 1970 season. Finding fielding increasingly tiring, although still enjoying batting, he left Worcestershire in 1970 and took up a position as player-coach for Queensland, returning after a generally unsuccessful period in Australia in 1972. He did play one magnificent innings though, in a semi final of the one day knockout competition at Adelaide Oval, where he scored 98 off of 112 balls to lead the unheralded Queensland team to an unlikely victory against a very strong South Australian team which featured 8 current or future test players. Against an attack that featured Freeman, Hammond, Greg Chappell, Mallet and Jenner, Graveney gave a superlative display of cover driving with exquisite timing that sent the crowd and local media into raptures. And all of this at 43 years of age.

=== Records and appreciation ===
In all, he played 79 Test matches for England between 1951 and 1969, scoring 4,882 runs at an average of 44.38 with a high score of 258 and 11 centuries. He scored 47,793 first-class runs (a figure bettered by only eight players), making 122 centuries. He is the only player to have scored more than 10,000 runs for two counties. He was described by The Daily Telegraph as "the greatest, as well as the most elegant and graceful, professional batsman to emerge in Britain in the years after the Second World War", and as "a throwback to cricket's golden age" with his attacking power and technique. The cricket writer Scyld Berry called him "a glorious stroke-maker condemned to play in a dour age." The Independent said that although he "never entirely won the trust" of the England selectors, "the exquisiteness of his touch never faded" and his achievements for England after his recall in 1966 "were the stuff of legend." The Times described him as "one of the finest English batsmen of the 1950s and 1960s, and arguably the most elegant of them all."

== Post-cricket career ==
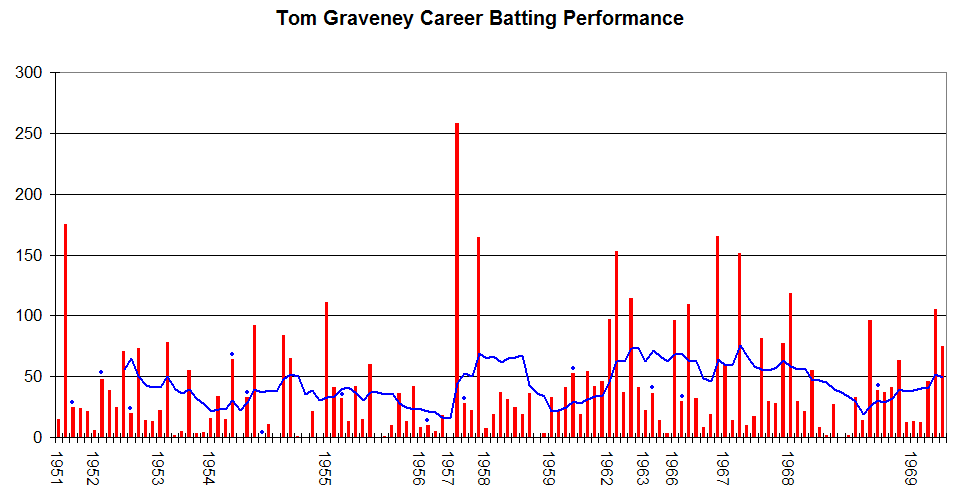
Tom Graveney's career performance graph

After retiring from cricket, he worked in various roles, including a squash club manager in Essex and a pub landlord in Prestbury, Gloucestershire. His wife, Jackie, said that being a publican was the first proper job Graveney had had in his life. For many years 3D Cricket in Cheltenham ran indoor cricket coaching courses advertised as 'Tom Graveney cricket courses' for young and adult cricketers. In 1979, he joined the BBC as a television cricket commentator and became the first former professional cricketer to be elected president of the Marylebone Cricket Club (MCC) in 2004. He served as president of Worcestershire from 1994 to 1998.

He was one of the first 55 people to be enrolled in the ICC Cricket Hall of Fame in 2009. His final cricket match was in 1995, when he played for the Lord's Taverners against the MCC President's XI: he scored 1 run before being caught by David Frost off the bowling of the actor Robert Powell. He continued to play golf, playing off a single-figure handicap, and building up a large collection of stamps, a hobby that he had begun when touring overseas.

Jackie, whom he married in 1952, developed Alzheimer's disease in later life and Graveney moved into a care home to be with her until her death in 2013. He died on 3 November 2015, aged 88, in the week after his brother Ken's death. He and Jackie had two children, Tim and Rebecca. His nephew, David (the son of his brother Ken), played for Gloucestershire and was later chairman of the England selectors.

== Notes ==
Sporting positions
Preceded by George Emmett	Gloucester County Cricket Club captain 1959–60	Succeeded by Tom Pugh
Preceded by Don Kenyon	Worcestershire County Cricket Club captain 1968–70	Succeeded by Norman Gifford
