= David Graveney =

English cricketer

Personal information
- Full name: David Anthony Graveney
- Born: 2 January 1953 (age 73); Westbury-on-Trym, Bristol
- Nickname: Gravity
- Height: 6 ft 4 in (1.93 m)
- Batting: Right-handed
- Bowling: Left-arm orthodox spin
- Role: All-rounder
- Relatives: Ken Graveney (father); Tom Graveney (uncle)

Domestic team information
- Years: Team
- 1972–1990: Gloucestershire
- 1991: Somerset
- 1992–1994: Durham
- FC debut: 5 August 1972 Gloucestershire v Lancashire
- Last FC: 29 August 1994 Durham v Hampshire
- LA debut: 23 July 1972 Gloucestershire v Worcestershire
- Last LA: 18 September 1994 Durham v Worcestershire

Career statistics
Competition	First-class	List A
Matches	457	382
Runs scored	7,107	2,263
Batting average	17.67	16.88
100s/50s	2/16	0/1
Top score	119	56*
Balls bowled	69,516	13,402
Wickets	981	287
Bowling average	30.44	32.01
5 wickets in innings	40	1
10 wickets in match	7	0
Best bowling	8/85	5/11
Catches/stumpings	241/–	102/–
- Source: CricketArchive, 11 December 2013

David Anthony Graveney OBE (born 2 January 1953) is a leading figure in English cricket and the Graveney dynasty, former chairman of the England Test selectors, a post he held from 1997 until 2008. Graveney attended Millfield School in Somerset.

He led a successful first-class cricket career between 1972 and 1994. He was a useful right hand batsman and an orthodox left-arm spinner who represented Gloucestershire (1972–1990) (captain 1982–1988), Somerset (1991) and Durham (1992–1994) (captain 1992–1993). He took 981 wickets in 457 first-class matches (with a personal best of 8/85) and 287 wickets in 382 List A limited-over matches (with a personal best of 5/11). He helped Gloucestershire to win the Benson and Hedges Cup in 1977.

He is a qualified chartered accountant and is a former chief executive of the Professional Cricketers' Association. He managed the rebel tour to South Africa in 1989–90. Late in his career he joined Durham as the county joined the County Championship. In June 1994, he played in the match but was able only to bowl seven overs due to injury, when Brian Lara made the highest individual score in first-class cricket history.

Graveney became chairman of the selectors in 1997, taking over from Ray Illingworth. On 31 December 2005, he was awarded the OBE for services to cricket. On 18 January 2008, Graveney was removed from the position and awarded the position of national performance manager, monitoring young players in domestic cricket. Geoff Miller took the position over, heading up a four-man panel which included Peter Moores, James Whitaker and Ashley Giles.

== Family links ==
His father Ken Graveney was a prolific right-arm fast bowler with Gloucestershire between 1947 and 1964, who once took 10/66 in an innings. He captained his county between 1963 and 1964. His uncle Tom Graveney was an elegant batsman with Gloucestershire and Worcestershire (captaining both counties), and played in 79 tests for England (one as captain).
