= Gloucestershire County Cricket Club =

English county cricket club

Gloucestershire CCC
- One Day name: Gloucestershire

Personnel
- Captain: Cameron Bancroft
- One Day captain: Jack Taylor
- Coach: Mark Alleyne
- Overseas player: Cameron Bancroft

Team information
- Founded: 1870; 156 years ago
- Home ground: Seat Unique Stadium
- Capacity: 7,500 – 17,500

History
- First-class debut: Surrey in 1870 at Durdham Down, Bristol
- Championship wins: 0 (unofficial Champion County 4 times)
- One-Day Cup wins: (2): 2000; 2015
- FP Trophy/NatWest Trophy wins: (5): 1973; 1999; 2000; 2003; 2004
- Benson & Hedges Cup wins: (3): 1977; 1999; 2000
- Twenty20 Cup wins: (1): 2024
- Official website: gloscricket.co.uk
First-class
One-day
T20

Gloucestershire County Cricket Club, founded in 1870, is one of 18 first-class county clubs within the domestic cricket structure of England and Wales. It represents the historic county of Gloucestershire. The team played its first senior match in 1870, under the captaincy of W. G. Grace.

Beginning with Grace, and his brothers E. M. and Fred, many great players have represented Gloucestershire, including Gilbert Jessop, Charlie Parker, Tom Goddard, Wally Hammond, Tom Graveney, Zaheer Abbas, Mike Procter, Jack Russell, Courtney Walsh, and Muttiah Muralitharan. The club has had two notable periods of success: in the 1870s, when it was unofficially acclaimed as the Champion County on at least three occasions; and from 1999 to 2006, when it won seven limited overs trophies, notably a 'double double' in 1999 and 2000 (the Benson and Hedges Cup and the C&G Trophy in both seasons), and the Sunday League in 2000.

Most of Gloucestershire's home games are played at the Bristol County Ground in the Bishopston area of north Bristol. Traditionally, the county has staged cricket festivals in Cheltenham and Gloucester, these matches being played at the College Ground in Cheltenham, and on Archdeacon Meadow at the King's School in Gloucester.

== Honours ==
=== First XI honours ===
- Champion County (3) – 1874, 1876, 1877, shared (1) – 1873
- County Championship (0)

Runners-up (6): 1930, 1931, 1947, 1959, 1969, 1986

- Royal London/Metro Bank One-Day Cup (1) – 2015

Semi-finalists (1): 2023

- Sunday/National League/Pro40 (1) – 2000

Runners-up (2): 1988, 2003
Division Two (2): 2002, 2006

- Gillette/NatWest/C&G Trophy (5) – 1973, 1999, 2000, 2003, 2004,

Semi-finalists (5): 1968, 1971, 1975, 1987, 2009

- Benson & Hedges Cup (3) – 1977, 1999, 2000

Finalists (1): 2001
Semi-finalists (1): 1972

- Twenty20 Cup (1) - 2024

Finalists (1): 2007
Semi-finalists (2): 2003, 2020

=== Second XI honours ===
- Second XI Championship (1) – 1959

== Earliest cricket ==
Cricket probably reached Gloucestershire by the end of the 17th century. It is known that the related sport of "Stow-Ball" aka "Stob-Ball" was played in the county during the 16th century. In this game, the bat was called a "stave". See Alice Gomme: The Traditional Games of England, Scotland and Ireland.

A game in Gloucester on 22 September 1729 is the earliest definite reference to cricket in the county. From then until the founding of the county club, very little has been found outside parish cricket.

== Origin of club ==
In the early 1840s, Dr Henry Grace and his brother-in-law Alfred Pocock founded the Mangotsfield Cricket Club which merged in 1846 with the West Gloucestershire Cricket Club, whose name was adopted until 1867, after which it became the Gloucestershire County Cricket Club. Grace hoped that Gloucestershire would join the first-class county clubs but the situation was complicated in 1863 by the formation of a rival club called the Cheltenham and Gloucestershire Cricket Club.

Dr Grace's club played Gloucestershire's initial first-class match versus Surrey at Durdham Down in Bristol on 2, 3 & 4 June 1870. Gloucestershire joined the (unofficial) County Championship at this time but the existence of the Cheltenham club seems to have forestalled the installation of its "constitutional trappings". The Cheltenham club was wound up in March 1871 and its chief officials accepted positions in the hierarchy of Gloucestershire. So, although the exact details and dates of the county club's foundation are uncertain, it has always been assumed that the year was 1870 and the club celebrated its centenary in 1970.

What is certain is that Dr Grace was able to form the county club because of its playing strength, especially his three sons W. G., E. M. and Fred.

== Club history ==
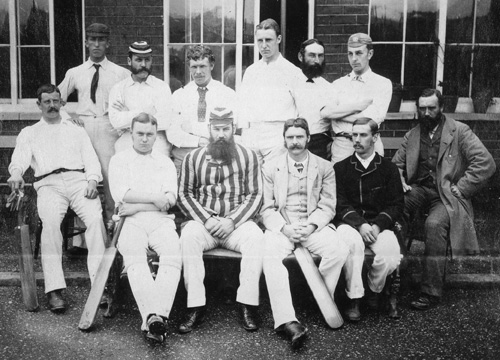
Gloucestershire CCC in 1880.

The early history of Gloucestershire is dominated by the Grace family, most notably W. G. Grace, who was the club's original captain and held that post until his departure for London in 1899. His brother E. M. Grace, although still an active player, was the original club secretary. With the Grace brothers and Billy Midwinter in their team, Gloucestershire won three Champion County titles in the 1870s.

Since then Gloucestershire's fortunes have been mixed and they have never won the official County Championship. They struggled in the pre-war years of the County Championship because their best batsmen, apart from Gilbert Jessop and briefly Charlie Townsend, were very rarely available. The bowling, except when Townsend did sensational things on sticky wickets in late 1895 and late 1898, was very weak until George Dennett emerged – then it had the fault of depending far too much on him. Wally Hammond, who still holds many of the county's batting records formed part of an occasionally strong inter-war team, although the highest championship finish during this period was second in 1930 and 1931, when Charlie Parker and Tom Goddard formed a devastating spin attack.

Outstanding players since the war include Tom Graveney, "Jack" Russell and overseas players Mike Procter, Zaheer Abbas and Courtney Walsh.

=== Dominance in one-day cricket (1999–2004) ===
Gloucestershire was very successful in one-day cricket in the late 1990s and early 2000s winning several titles under the captaincy of Mark Alleyne and coaching of John Bracewell. The club operated on a small budget and was famed as a team greater than the sum of its parts, boasting few international stars. Gloucestershire's overall knockout record between 1999 and 2002 was 28 wins and seven losses from 37 games, including 16 wins from 18 at the Bristol County Ground.

The club's run of success started by defeating Yorkshire to win the Benson & Hedges Super Cup in 1999 before then beating neighbours Somerset in the 1999 NatWest Trophy final at Lord's. In 2000 Gloucestershire completed a hat-trick of one-day titles, winning all the domestic limited overs tournaments, the Benson and Hedges Cup, the C&G Trophy and the Sunday League in the same season. The club maintained its success winning the C&G Trophy in 2003 and 2004, beating Worcestershire in the final on both occasions.

=== Recent years (2006–present) ===
The club's captain for the 2006 season, Jon Lewis, became the first Gloucestershire player for nearly 10 years to play for England at Test match level, when he was picked to represent his country in the Third Test against Sri Lanka at Trent Bridge in June 2006. His figures in the first innings were 3–68, including a wicket in his first over in Test cricket, and he was widely praised for his debut performance.

Following the retirement of several key players, such as "Jack" Russell and Mark Alleyne, Gloucestershire's fortunes declined. The club subsequently stripped back its playing budget as it looked to finance the redevelopment of the Bristol County Ground in order to maintain Category B status and secure future international games at their home ground. Performances suffered and despite reaching the final of the 2007 Twenty20 Cup, losing narrowly to Kent, the club failed to win any major trophies for a decade.

In 2013 Gloucestershire stopped using 'Gloucestershire Gladiators' as its limited-overs name.

Gloucestershire won their first major silverware for 11 years in 2015, overcoming favoured Surrey to win the Royal London One-Day Cup in the final at Lord's. Captain Michael Klinger, who flew back from Australia to play in the semi-final win over Yorkshire, was named the tournament's MVP scoring 531 runs at an average of over 106.

In 2024 Gloucestershire broke their T20 Blast duck, winning it for the first time with wins over Sussex in the semi final and West Country rivals Somerset in the final. The Shire became the first county to take 20 wickets on a single Finals Day, while David Payne became the leading pace bowling wicket taker in the history of the T20 Blast after picking up three wickets in the final.

== Rivalries ==
Gloucestershire contest one of English cricket's fiercest rivalries, the West Country derby against Somerset, which usually draws the biggest crowd of the season for either team. Traditionally, the boundary between the counties is drawn by the River Avon. Although Gloucestershire CCC's home ground is in Bristol, which straddles the Avon (and has been a county in its own right since 1373), many people from south Bristol favour Somerset CCC despite the fact the club plays its home games much further away in Taunton. In the past, Somerset played first-class matches at venues in the south of Bristol.

== Grounds ==
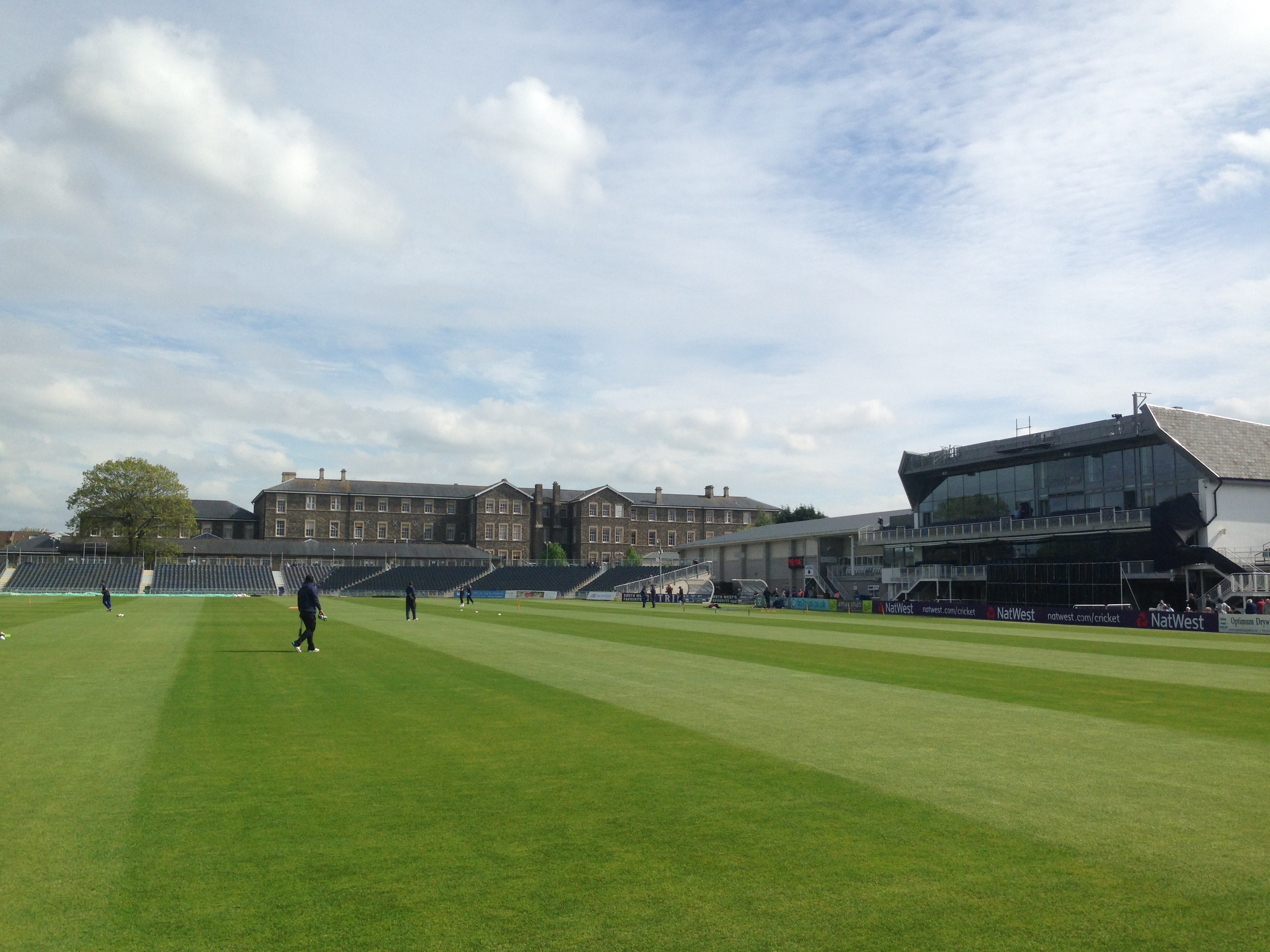
The Bristol County Ground

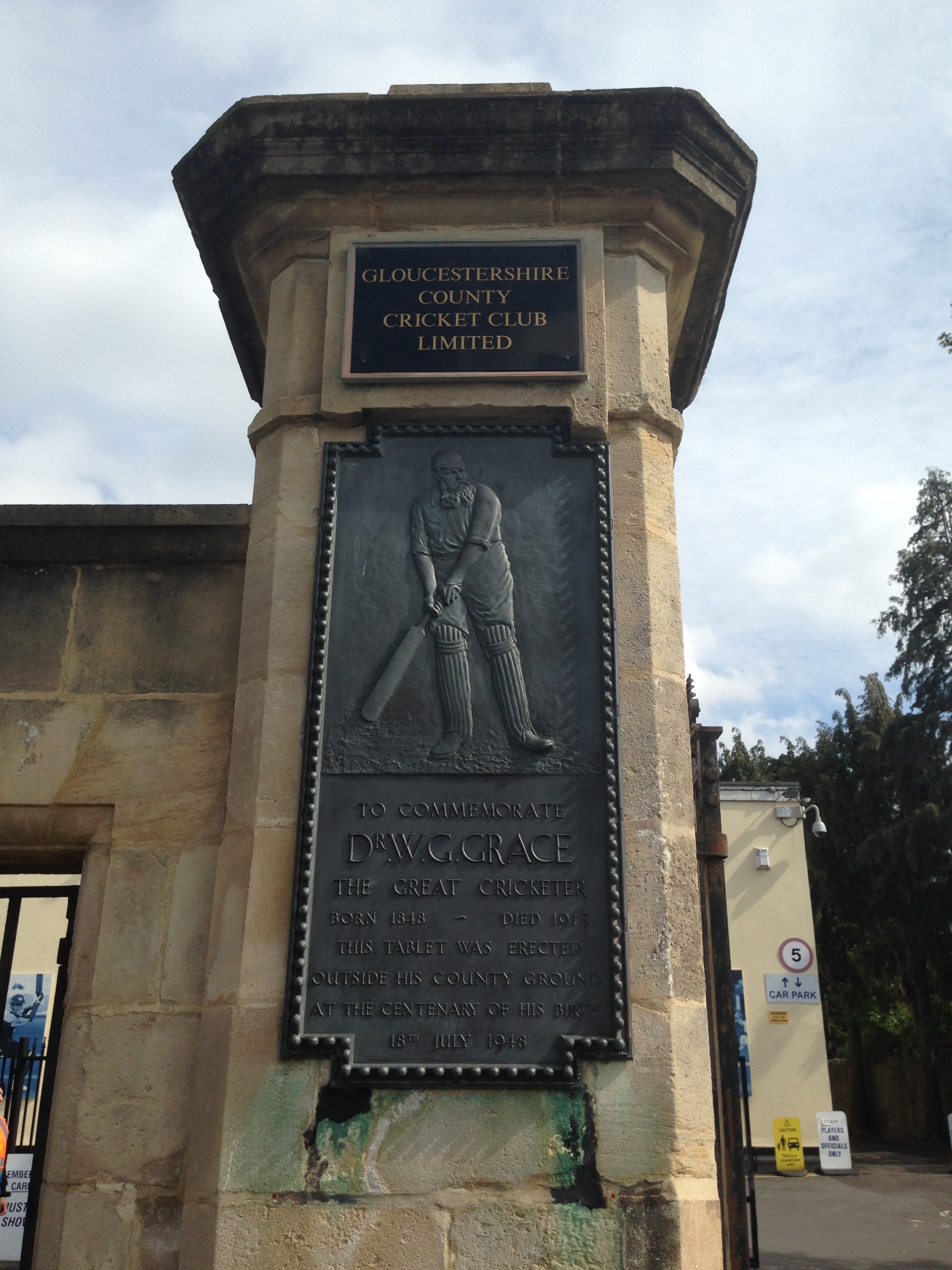
A tablet of W. G. Grace at the Grace Gates of the Bristol County Ground

The club's debut home match in first-class cricket was played at Durdham Down in the Clifton district of Bristol. This was the only time the county used this venue for a match. The following year Gloucestershire began to play matches at the Clifton College Close Ground in the grounds of Clifton College in the same part of the city, and this remained a regular venue for the county until the 1930s, hosting nearly 100 first-class matches. In 1872 the county used a venue outside Bristol for the first time when they played at the College Ground in the grounds of Cheltenham College. This venue has continued to be used regularly for the county's annual "Cheltenham festival" event, which in the modern era incorporates additional charity events and off-field entertainment. In 1889 Gloucestershire began to play matches at the Bristol County Ground in Bristol, which has subsequently served as the club's main headquarters and hosted the majority of the county's matches. It was here that the club played its first List A match in 1963 against Middlesex, and its first Twenty20 match forty years later against Worcestershire. Somerset have played first-class matches at other venues in the city.

In the 1920s Gloucestershire ceased playing at the Spa Ground in Gloucester, which had been in use since 1882, and switched to the Wagon Works Ground in the city. This ground remained in use for nearly 70 years, hosting over 150 first-class matches, before its use was discontinued in 1992. In 2012 the club investigated the possibility of returning to the Wagon Works Ground and making it their permanent headquarters after being refused permission for extensive redevelopment of the County Ground in Bristol, but ultimately this did not occur. In 1993, the club moved its base in Gloucester to Archdeacon Meadow, a ground owned by The King's School. This venue was only used for first-class matches until 2008 but was used for four Twenty20 matches in 2010 and 2011, the most recent county games to take place in the city. All subsequent matches have taken place in either Bristol or Cheltenham.

== Players ==
=== Current squad ===
- No. denotes the player's squad number, as worn on the back of their shirt.
- ‡ denotes players with international caps.

No.	Name	Nat	Birth date	Batting style	Bowling style	Notes
Batters
1	Cameron Bancroft ‡	Australia	19 November 1992 (age 33)	Right-handed	—	Club captain; Overseas player
10	Jack Taylor	England	12 November 1991 (age 34)	Right-handed	Right-arm leg break	Captain (List A & T20)
23	Dawid Malan ‡	England	3 September 1987 (age 39)	Left-handed	Right-arm leg break	White ball contract
24	Joe Phillips	England	9 November 2003 (age 22)	Right-handed	Right-arm off break	
71	Tommy Boorman	England	12 April 2005 (age 21)	Right-handed	Right-arm off break	
73	Kamran Dhariwal	England	8 March 2005 (age 21)	Right-handed	—	
88	Miles Hammond	England	11 January 1996 (age 30)	Left-handed	Right-arm off break	
—	Tom Alsop	England	26 November 1995 (age 30)	Left-handed	—	
All-rounders
12	Graeme van Buuren	South Africa	22 August 1990 (age 36)	Right-handed	Slow left-arm orthodox	UK Passport
67	Ollie Price	England	12 June 2001 (age 25)	Right-handed	Right-arm off break	
77	Daz Ahmed	England	17 September 2000 (age 26)	Right-handed	Right-arm fast-medium	
Wicket-keepers
25	James Bracey ‡	England	3 May 1997 (age 29)	Left-handed	—	
Bowlers
8	Will Williams	New Zealand	6 October 1992 (age 33)	Right-handed	Right-arm fast-medium	UK Passport
13	James Hayes	England	27 June 2001 (age 25)	Right-handed	Right-arm fast-medium	
14	David Payne ‡	England	15 February 1991 (age 35)	Left-handed	Left-arm fast-medium	White ball contract
22	Aman Rao	England	22 June 2004 (age 22)	Right-handed	Right-arm fast-medium	
28	Henry Brookes	England	21 August 1999 (age 27)	Right-handed	Right-arm fast-medium	
36	Matthew Taylor	England	8 July 1994 (age 32)	Right-handed	Left-arm fast-medium	
54	Alfie Johnson	England	19 January 2007 (age 19)	Left-handed	Right-arm off break	
90	Marchant de Lange ‡	South Africa	13 October 1990 (age 35)	Right-handed	Right-arm fast	UK Passport; White ball contract
99	Che Simmons	Barbados	18 December 2003 (age 22)	Right-handed	Right-arm fast-medium	UK passport
Source: Updated: 27 September 2026

== International players ==
Among the international players who have represented Gloucestershire are:

- W. G. Grace
- E. M. Grace
- Fred Grace
- Billy Midwinter
- Gilbert Jessop
- Charlie Parker
- Wally Hammond
- Tom Goddard
- Sam Cook
- Tom Graveney
- Arthur Milton
- Mike Procter
- Zaheer Abbas
- Sadiq Mohammad
- Courtney Walsh
- David Lawrence
- Jack Russell
- Javagal Srinath
- Malinga Bandara
- Marcus North
- Aaron Redmond
- Ian Butler
- Hamish Marshall
- James Franklin
- Kane Williamson
- Rob Nicol
- Muttiah Muralitharan
- Ed Cowan
- Dan Christian
- Cameron Bancroft
- Michael Klinger
- Andrew Tye
- Peter Handscomb
- Mark Craig
- Cheteshwar Pujara
- Kevin Curran

== Club captains ==
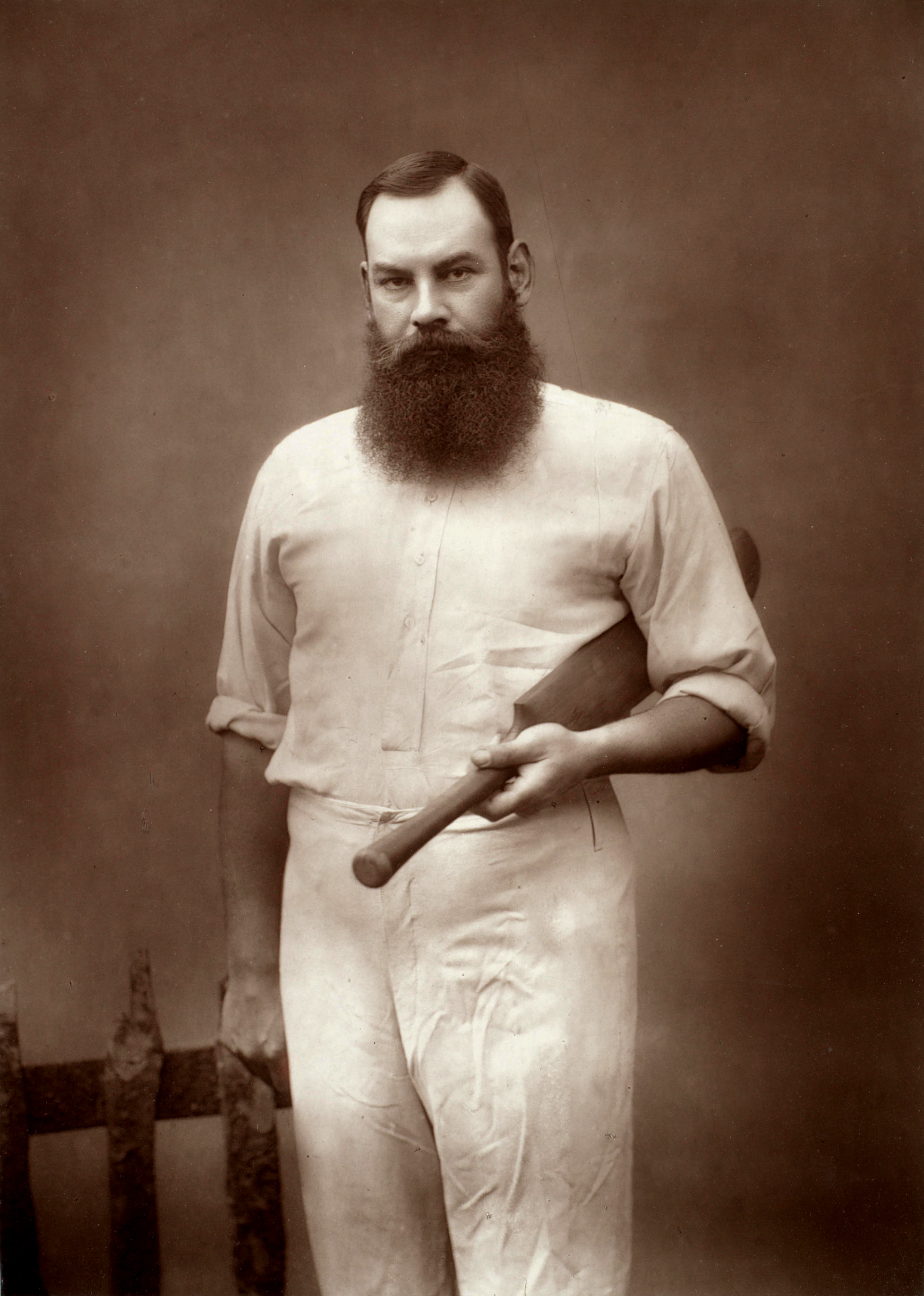
W. G. Grace dominated the club's early history. He made 22,808 runs and took 1,339 wickets for the county.

- W. G. Grace 1870–1898
  (Longest Serving Captain)
- W. G. Grace, Walter Troup 1899
- Gilbert Jessop 1900–1912
- Cyril Sewell 1913–1914
- Foster Robinson 1919–1921
- Philip Williams 1922–1923
- Douglas Robinson : 1924–1926
- William Rowlands 1927–1928
- Bev Lyon 1929–1934
- Dallas Page 1935–1936
- Basil Allen 1937–1938
- Wally Hammond 1939–1946
- Basil Allen 1947–1950
- Derrick Bailey 1951–1952
- Jack Crapp 1953–1954
- George Emmett 1955–1958
- Tom Graveney 1959–1960
- Tom Pugh 1961–1962
- Ken Graveney 1963–1964
- John Mortimore 1965–1967
- Arthur Milton 1968
- Tony Brown 1969–1976
- Mike Procter 1977–1981
- David Graveney 1982–1988
- Bill Athey 1989
- Tony Wright 1990–1992
- Tony Wright, Courtney Walsh 1993
- Courtney Walsh 1994
- Jack Russell 1995
- Courtney Walsh 1996
- Mark Alleyne 1997–2003
- Chris Taylor 2004–2005
- Jon Lewis 2006–2008
- Alex Gidman 2009–2012
- Michael Klinger 2013–2014
- Geraint Jones 2015
- Gareth Roderick 2016–2017
- Chris Dent 2018–2021
- Graeme van Buuren 2022–2024
- Cameron Bancroft 2025–present

== Records ==
Most first-class runs for Gloucestershire
Qualification – 20,000 runs

Player	Runs
Wally Hammond	33,664
Arthur Milton	30,218
Alfred Dipper	27,948
Ron Nicholls	23,607
Martin Young	23,400
W. G. Grace	22,808
George Emmett	22,806
Jack Crapp	22,195
Charlie Barnett	21,221

Most first-class wickets for Gloucestershire
Qualification – 1,000 wickets

Player	Wickets
Charlie Parker	3,170
Tom Goddard	2,862
George Dennett	2,082
Sam Cook	1,768
John Mortimore	1,696
W. G. Grace	1,339
Tony Brown	1,223
Reg Sinfield	1,165
David Smith	1,159

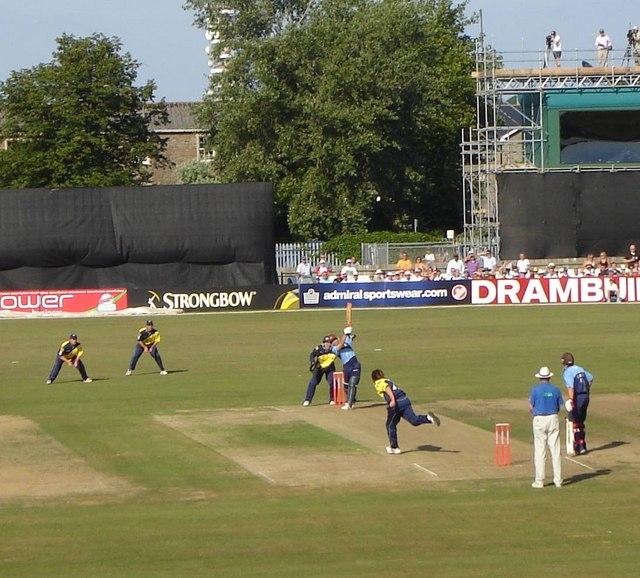
Bristol County Ground before redevelopment

Team totals

- Highest total for – 706–6 declared v. Leicestershire, Grace Road, Leicester, 2024
- Highest total against – 774–7 declared by the Australians, Bristol, 1948
- Lowest total for – 17 v. the Australians, Cheltenham (Spa), 22 August 1896
- Lowest total against – 12 by Northamptonshire, Gloucester, 1907

Batting

- Highest score – 341 Craig Spearman v. Middlesex, Gloucester, 2004
- Most runs in season – 2,860 W. R. Hammond, 1933
- Most hundreds in career – 113 W. R. Hammond, 1920–1951

Best partnership for each wicket

- 1st – 395 D. M. Young & R. B. Nicholls v. Oxford University, Oxford, 1962
- 2nd – 256 C. T. M. Pugh & T. W. Graveney v. Derbyshire, Chesterfield, 1960
- 3rd – 392 A. P. R. Gidman & G. H. Roderick v. Leicestershire, Bristol, 2014
- 4th – 321 W. R. Hammond & W. L. Neale v. Leicestershire, Gloucester, 1937
- 5th – 277 J. R. Bracey & G. L. van Buuren v. Derbyshire, Bristol, 2024
- 6th – 320 G. L. Jessop & J. H. Board v. Sussex, Hove, 1903
- 7th – 248 W. G. Grace & E. L. Thomas v. Sussex, Hove, 1896
- 8th – 239 W. R. Hammond & A. E. Wilson v. Lancashire, Bristol, 1938
- 9th – 193 W. G. Grace & S. A. P. Kitcat v. Sussex, Bristol, 1896
- 10th – 137 L. C. Norwell & C. N. Miles v. Worcestershire, Cheltenham, 2014

Bowling

- Best bowling – 10–40 E. G. Dennett v. Essex, Bristol, 1906
- Best match bowling – 17–56 C. W. L. Parker v. Essex, Gloucester, 1925
- Wickets in season – 222 T. W. J. Goddard, 1937 and 1947

== See also ==
- GCCC in 2004
- GCCC in 2005
- GCCC in 2006

== Bibliography ==
- H. S. Altham, A History of Cricket, Volume 1 (to 1914), George Allen & Unwin, 1962
- Derek Birley, A Social History of English Cricket, Aurum, 1999
- Rowland Bowen, Cricket: A History of its Growth and Development, Eyre & Spottiswoode, 1970
- Simon Rae, W G Grace, Faber & Faber, 1998
- J. R. Webber, The Chronicle Of W.G., The Association Of Cricket Statisticians and Historians, 1998
- Roy Webber, The Playfair Book of Cricket Records, Playfair Books, 1951
- Playfair Cricket Annual – various editions
- Wisden Cricketers' Almanack – various editions
