= 1992 in the United Kingdom =

Events from the year 1992 in the United Kingdom. This year was the Ruby Jubilee of Elizabeth II.

This year is notable for a fourth-term general election victory for the Conservative Party; "Black Wednesday" (16 September), the suspension of the UK's membership of the European Exchange Rate Mechanism; and an annus horribilis for the Royal Family.

== Incumbents ==
- Monarch – Elizabeth II
- Prime Minister – John Major (Conservative)

== Events ==
=== January ===
- January – Statistics show that economic growth returned during the final quarter of 1991 after five successive quarters of contraction.
- 9 January
  - Liberal Democrat leader Paddy Ashdown proposes a £3billion package which would create 400,000 jobs in 12 months.
  - Alison Halford, the UK's most senior policewoman, is suspended from duty for a second time following a Merseyside police authority meeting.
- 10 January – The first full week of 1992 sees some 4,000 jobs lost across the UK, as the nation's recession continues. Almost 20% of those job cuts have been by GEC, the UK's leading telecommunications manufacturer, where 750 redundancies are announced today.
- 14 January – The Bank of Credit and Commerce International goes into liquidation.
- 17 January
  - Eight people are killed in the Teebane bombing carried out by the Provisional Irish Republican Army (IRA) in Northern Ireland.
  - The first MORI poll of 1992 shows the Conservatives three points ahead of Labour on 42%, while the Liberal Democrats have their best showing yet with 16% of the vote.
- 27 January – Actress Dame Gwen Ffrangcon-Davies dies at Halstead, Essex, two days after her 101st birthday, and a month after the screening of her final acting role.
- 29 January – The Department of Health reveals that AIDS cases among heterosexuals increased by 50% between 1990 and 1991.
- 30 January – John Major agrees a weapons control deal with new Russian premier Boris Yeltsin at 10 Downing Street.

=== February ===
- 2 February – Neil Kinnock, Labour leader, denies reports that he had a "Kremlin connection" during the 1980s.
- 6 February – The Queen commemorates her Ruby Jubilee, the first British monarch to do so since her great-great-grandmother Queen Victoria in 1877.
- 7 February – Signing of the Maastricht Treaty.
- 8–23 February – Great Britain and Northern Ireland compete at the Winter Olympics in Albertville, France, but do not win any medals.
- 9 February – Prime Minister John Major speaks of his hopes that the recession will soon be over as the economy is now showing signs of recovery.
- 15 February – Neil Kinnock, Labour Party leader, speaks of his belief that the Conservative government's failure to halt the current recession will win his party the forthcoming general election.
- 18 February – David Stevens, head of community relations, blames the recession for the recent rise in crime across the UK – most of all in deprived areas.
- 20 February – Hopes of an end to the recession are dashed by government figures which reveal that GDP fell by 0.3% in the final quarter of 1991.
- 23 February – The London Business School predicts an economic growth rate of 1.2% for this year, sparking hopes that the recession is nearing its end.

=== March ===
- March
  - The Saatchi Gallery in London stages the Young British Artists exhibition, featuring Damien Hirst's "shark", The Physical Impossibility of Death in the Mind of Someone Living.
  - Toyota launches the Carina E large family hatchback, saloon and estate range which will initially be imported from Japan before production of European market models commences later this year at the new Burnaston plant near Derby.
- 6 March – Parliament passes the Further and Higher Education Act, allowing polytechnics to become new universities. Legislation passed under the Act on 4 June allows them to award degrees of their own, and they thus reopen in September for the new academic year with the status of universities. In addition, sixth form colleges are to become independent of local education authority control.
- 11 March
  - John Major announces a general election for 9 April.
  - Shadow Chancellor John Smith condemns the recent Budget as a "missed opportunity" by the Conservatives, saying that they did "nothing" for jobs, training, skills, construction or economic recovery.
- 13 March – The first ecumenical church in Britain, the Christ the Cornerstone Church in Milton Keynes is opened.
- 17 March – Shadow Chancellor John Smith announces that there will be no tax reductions this year if Labour win the election.
- 19 March
  - Buckingham Palace announces that the Duke and Duchess of York are to separate following six years of marriage.
  - Unemployment has reached 2,647,300 – 9.4% of the British workforce, the highest level since late 1987.
- 24 March
  - Election campaigning becomes dominated by the "War of Jennifer's Ear".
  - The editors of Punch, the UK's oldest satirical magazine, announce that it will be discontinued due to massive losses. In circulation since 1841, it publishes its last issue on 8 April.
- 25 March – Aldershot F.C., bottom of the Football League Fourth Division, are declared bankrupt and become the first Football League club in 30 years to resign from the league.
- 26 March – Television entertainer Roy Castle (59), who currently presents Record Breakers, announces that he is suffering from lung cancer.
- 29 March – John Spencer, 8th Earl Spencer and father of Princess Diana, dies suddenly from pneumonia at the age of 68.

=== April ===
- April – Statistics show that the first quarter of this year saw the economy grow for the second quarter running, the sequel to five successive quarters of detraction, though the growth is still too narrow for the recession to be declared over.
- 1 April – The latest opinion polls show a narrow lead for Labour, which would force a hung parliament in the election next week.
- 4 April – Party Politics becomes the tallest horse to win the Grand National.
- 5 April – At his pre-election speech, Neil Kinnock promises a strong economic recovery if he leads the Labour party to election victory on Thursday.
- 6 April – Women's Royal Army Corps disbanded, its members being fully absorbed into the regular British Army.
- 7 April – The final MORI poll before the general election shows Labour one point ahead of the Conservatives on 39%, while the Liberal Democrats continue to enjoy a surge in popularity with 20% of the vote. Most opinion polls show a similar situation, hinting at either a narrow Labour majority or a hung parliament.
- 9 April – General election: the Conservative Party are re-elected for a fourth successive term, in their first election under John Major's leadership. Their majority is reduced to 21 seats but they have attracted more than 14,000,000 votes – the highest number of votes ever attracted to a party in a general election. Notable retirements from the House of Commons at this election include former prime minister Margaret Thatcher and former Labour leader Michael Foot.
- 10 April
  - Three people are killed in the Baltic Exchange bombing, a van bomb planted by the IRA in the City of London.
  - With the government's victory in the election confirmed, John Major assures the public that he will lead the country out of recession that has blighted it for nearly two years.
- 11 April – Publication of The Sun newspaper's iconic front-page headline 'It's The Sun Wot Won It', as the tabloid newspaper claims it won the general election for the Conservatives with its anti-Kinnock front-page headline on election day.
- 12 April – Manchester United win the Football League Cup for the first time with a 1–0 win over Nottingham Forest in the Wembley final. Brian McClair scores the only goal of the game.
- 13 April
  - Neil Kinnock resigns as leader of the Labour Party following the defeat of his party in the General Election. He had led the party for eight-and-a-half years since October 1983, and is the longest serving opposition leader in British political history.
  - The Princess Royal announces her divorce from Capt Mark Phillips after 19 years of marriage, having separated in 1989.
- 16 April – Unemployment has now risen 23 months in succession, but the March rise in unemployment is the smallest monthly rise so far.
- 17–20 April – Lost Gardens of Heligan in Cornwall first opened to the public.
- 18 April – Comedian and actor Benny Hill dies suddenly from a heart attack at his home in Teddington, London, aged 68 (but is not found for 2 days).
- 19 April – Comedian and actor Frankie Howerd dies suddenly from a heart attack in Fulham, London, aged 75.
- 27 April – Betty Boothroyd, 62-year-old Labour MP for West Bromwich West in the West Midlands, is elected as Speaker of the House of Commons, the first woman to hold the position.

=== May ===
- 5 May – UEFA awards the 1996 European Football Championships to England, who will be hosting a major tournament for the first time since the 1966 World Cup.
- 6 May – John Major promises British voters improved services and more money to spend.
- 9 May – Liverpool win the FA Cup for the fifth time, beating Sunderland 2–0 in the Wembley final. Ian Rush and Michael Thomas score Liverpool's goals.
- 12–15 May – Rioting breaks out on the Wood End housing estate in Coventry, and spreads to the Willenhall district.
- 12 May – Plans are unveiled for a fifth terminal at Heathrow Airport, which is now the busiest airport in the world.
- 17 May – Nigel Mansell gains the 26th Grand Prix win of his racing career at Imola, San Marino. He is now the most successful British driver in Grand Prix races, and the fourth worldwide.
- 22 May – Twenty-two "Maastricht Rebels" vote against the government on the second reading of the European Communities (Amendment) Bill.
- 22–29 May – A week-long rave festival in Castlemorton Common in the Malvern Hills is held, causing media outrage due to drug-use and noise complaints from neighbours.

=== June ===
- June – Cones Hotline introduced enabling members of the public to complain about traffic cones being deployed on a road for no apparent reason.
- 16 June – A controversial new biography of the Princess of Wales, Diana: Her True Story, written by Andrew Morton, is published, revealing that she has made five suicide attempts following her discovery that the Prince of Wales (the later Charles III) had resumed an affair with his previous girlfriend Mrs Parker Bowles (the later Queen Camilla) shortly after Prince William's birth in 1982. After Diana's death, it is revealed that she was interviewed extensively for the book.
- 17 June
  - Almost 2.7 million people are now out of work as unemployment continues to rise.
  - The England national football team are eliminated from the European Championships in Sweden after losing 2–1 to the host nation in their final group game.
- 24 June – Ravenscraig steelworks, the largest hot strip steel mill in Western Europe, closes, ending steelmaking in Scotland.
- 25 June – GDP is reported to have fallen by 0.5% in the first quarter of this year as the recession continues.
- 30 June – Margaret Thatcher enters the House of Lords as Baroness Thatcher.

=== July ===
- July – Statistics show that the economy contracted during the second quarter of this year.
- 2 July – The IRA admits to murdering three men whose bodies were found by the army at various locations around Armagh last night. The men are believed to have been informers employed by MI5.
- 9 July – Riots break out in Ordsall, Greater Manchester.
- 10 July – Another sign of economic recovery is shown as inflation falls from 4.3% to 3.9%.
- 15 July – Killing of Rachel Nickell: a 23-year-old mother is stabbed to death in broad daylight while out walking her dog on Wimbledon Common; her murderer, Robert Napper, will not be convicted until 2008.
- 16 July – Riots break out in Hartcliffe, Bristol, following the deaths of two local men who died when the stolen police motorcycle they were riding was hit by a police car.
- 17 July
  - John Smith is elected leader of the Labour Party.
  - Official opening of Manchester Metrolink, the first new-generation light rail system with street running in the British Isles.
- 21 July – British Airways announces a takeover of USAir.
- 22 July – Riots break out in Blackburn, Burnley and Huddersfield.
- 23 July – Three months after losing the general election, Labour finish four points ahead of the Conservatives in a MORI poll, with 43% of the vote.
- 25 July–9 August – Great Britain and Northern Ireland compete at the Olympics in Barcelona and win 5 gold, 3 silver and 12 bronze medals.
- 26 July – Riots break out in the Peckham and Southwark districts of South London.
- 27 July – Alan Shearer becomes England's most expensive footballer in a £3.6 million transfer from Southampton to Blackburn Rovers. Shearer, who turns 22 next month, was a member of England's Euro 92 national squad, having scored on his debut in a friendly international against France in February this year.

=== August ===
- August – Graham Norton debuts at the Edinburgh Festival Fringe.
- 6 August – Lord Hope, the Lord President of the Court of Session, Scotland's most senior judge, permits the televising of appeals in both criminal and civil cases, the first time that cameras have been allowed into courts in the United Kingdom.
- 10 August – Nissan commences production of its British built Micra supermini, which goes on sale in Britain and the rest of Europe at the end of this year.
- 15 August – The new FA Premier League commences.
- 16 August – English driver Nigel Mansell comes in second in the Hungarian Grand Prix and wins the 1992 Formula One season with five races still remaining. Mansell becomes the first Briton to win the title since James Hunt in the 1976 Formula One season.
- 17 August – Five months after the demise of Aldershot FC, Maidstone United resign from the Football League due to large debts and being unable to fulfill their fixtures for the new Division Three season.
- 20 August – Intimate photographs of Sarah, Duchess of York and a Texan businessman, John Bryan, are published in the Daily Mirror.
- 29 August – The World Wrestling Federation holds its SummerSlam event at Wembley Stadium in London, England, to crowd of 78,927.

=== September ===
- 5 September – Italian supercar manufacturer Ferrari announces that its Formula One division will be designing and manufacturing cars in the UK.
- 7 September – Britain's first national commercial radio station, Classic FM, launches, broadcasting classical music.
- 13 September – Nigel Mansell announces his retirement from Formula One racing.
- 16 September – "Black Wednesday" sees the government suspending the UK's membership of the European Exchange Rate Mechanism following a wave of speculation against the Pound.
- 17 September – There is more bad news for the economy as unemployment is at a five-year high of 2,845,508, and experts warn that it will soon hit 3,000,000 for the first time since early 1987.
- 18 September – The latest MORI poll shows the Labour Party four points ahead of the Conservatives at 43%, following the events of Black Wednesday two days earlier.
- 19 September – Operatic bass-baritone Sir Geraint Evans dies in Bronglais Hospital, Aberystwyth, aged 70.
- 24 September – David Mellor resigns as Heritage Minister amid tabloid press speculation that he had been conducting an adulterous affair with actress Antonia de Sancha.
- 30 September – The Royal Mint introduces a new 10-pence coin which is lighter and smaller than the previous coin.

=== October ===
- October
  - First Cochrane Centre opens.
  - Statistics show a return to economic growth for the third quarter of this year.
- 7 October – Brutal murder of Nikki Allan, a seven-year-old girl, in Sunderland; a conviction in the case is not achieved until May 2023.
- 9 October – Two suspected IRA bombs explode in London, but there are no injuries.
- 13 October – The government announces the closure of a third of Britain's deep coal mines, with the loss of 31,000 jobs.
- 14 October – The England football team begins its qualification campaign for the 1994 FIFA World Cup with a 1–1 draw against Norway at Wembley Stadium.
- 15 October – The value of the pound sterling is reported to have dipped further as the recession deepens.
- 16 October – The government attempts to tackle the recession by cutting the base interest rate to 8% – the lowest since June 1988.
- 19 October – John Major announces that only ten deep coal mines will be closed.
- 21 October – Commodore UK release the new Amiga 1200 computer.
- 25 October – Around 100,000 people protest in London against the government's pit closure plans.
- 26 October – British Steel Corporation announces a 20% production cut as a result in falling demand from its worldwide customer base.
- 30 October – IRA terrorists force a taxi driver to drive to Downing Street at gunpoint and once there they detonate a bomb, but there are no injuries.

=== November ===
- 11 November – The Church of England votes to allow women to become priests.
- 12 November
  - British Telecom reports a £1.03 billion profit for the half year ending 30 September – a fall of 36.2% on the previous half year figure, as a result of the thousands of redundancies it has made this year due to the recession.
  - Unemployment has continued to climb and is now approaching 2,900,000. It has risen every month since June 1990, when it was below 1,700,000. The current level has not been seen since mid-1987.
- 16 November – The Hoxne Hoard is discovered by metal detectorist Eric Lawes in Suffolk.
- 19 November – The High Court rules that doctors can disconnect feeding tubes from Tony Bland, a young man who has been in a coma since the Hillsborough disaster in 1989. Bland, of Liverpool, suffered massive brain damage in the disaster and doctors treating him say that there is no reasonable possibility that he could recover consciousness and in his current condition would be unlikely to survive more than five years.
- 20 November – Part of Windsor Castle is gutted in a fire, causing millions of pounds worth of damage.
- 23 November – Ford unveils the new Mondeo, which succeeds the long-running Sierra and goes on sale in March 1993.
- 24 November – The Queen describes this year as an Annus Horribilis (horrible year) due to various scandals damaging the image of the Royal Family, as well as the Windsor Castle fire.
- 26 November
  - The Queen is to be taxed from next year, marking the end of almost 60 tax-free years for the British monarchy.
  - Pepper v Hart, a landmark case, is decided in the House of Lords on the use of legislative history in statutory interpretation, establishing the principle that when primary legislation is ambiguous then, under certain circumstances, the courts may refer to statements made during its passage through parliament in an attempt to interpret its intended meaning, an action previously regarded as a breach of parliamentary privilege.
- 29 November – Ethnic minorities now account for more than 3,000,000 (over 5%) of the British population.

=== December ===
- 3 December – Two IRA bombings take place in Manchester.
- 9 December – The separation of the Prince and Princess of Wales (Charles and Diana) is announced following months of speculation about their marriage, but there are no plans for a divorce and John Major announces that Diana could still become Queen.
- 11 December – The last MORI poll of 1992 shows Labour thirteen points ahead of the Conservatives on 47%, just three months after several polls had shown a Conservative lead. Black Wednesday, which has damaged much of the government's reputation for monetary excellence, is largely blamed for the fall in Conservative support.
- 12 December – The marriage of Anne, Princess Royal, and Timothy Laurence takes place.
- 16 December
  - Four people are injured by IRA bombs in Oxford Street, London.
  - Japanese carmaker Toyota opens a factory at Burnaston, near Derby, which produces the Carina family saloon.
- 17 December
  - The national unemployment level has risen to more than 2.9 million, with the unemployment rate in the south-east of England now above 10% for the first time.
  - Jonathan Zito is stabbed to death by Christopher Clunis, a partially treated schizophrenic patient.
- 23 December – The Queen's Royal Christmas Message is leaked in The Sun newspaper, 48 hours ahead of its traditional Christmas Day broadcast on television.
- 31 December
  - Thames Television, TVS, TSW and TV-am broadcast for the last time. The ORACLE teletext service is discontinued on ITV and Channel 4 to be replaced by a new service operated by the Teletext Ltd. consortium, having been launched on ITV in 1978 and used by Channel 4 since its inception in 1982.
  - The economy has grown in the final quarter of this year – the second successive quarter of economic growth – but the recovery is still too weak for the end of the recession to be declared.

=== Undated ===
- Inflation has fallen to a six-year low to 3.7%.
- Stella Rimington is appointed as the first female Director General of MI5.
- Barbara Mills is appointed as the first female Director of Public Prosecutions (England and Wales).
- Palawan Press is founded in London.
- Most leading retailers, including WH Smith, withdraw vinyl records from stock due to a sharp decline in sales brought on by the rising popularity of compact discs and audio cassettes.

== Publications ==
- Douglas Adams' novel Mostly Harmless.
- Iain Banks' novel The Crow Road.
- Louis de Bernières' novel The Troublesome Offspring of Cardinal Guzman.
- Alasdair Gray's novel Poor Things
- Nick Hornby's novel Fever Pitch.
- Ian McEwan's novel Black Dogs.
- Terry Pratchett's Discworld novels Small Gods and Lords and Ladies; and his Johnny Maxwell novel Only You Can Save Mankind.
- Adam Thorpe's novel Ulverton.
- Barry Unsworth's novel Sacred Hunger.

== Births ==
=== January ===
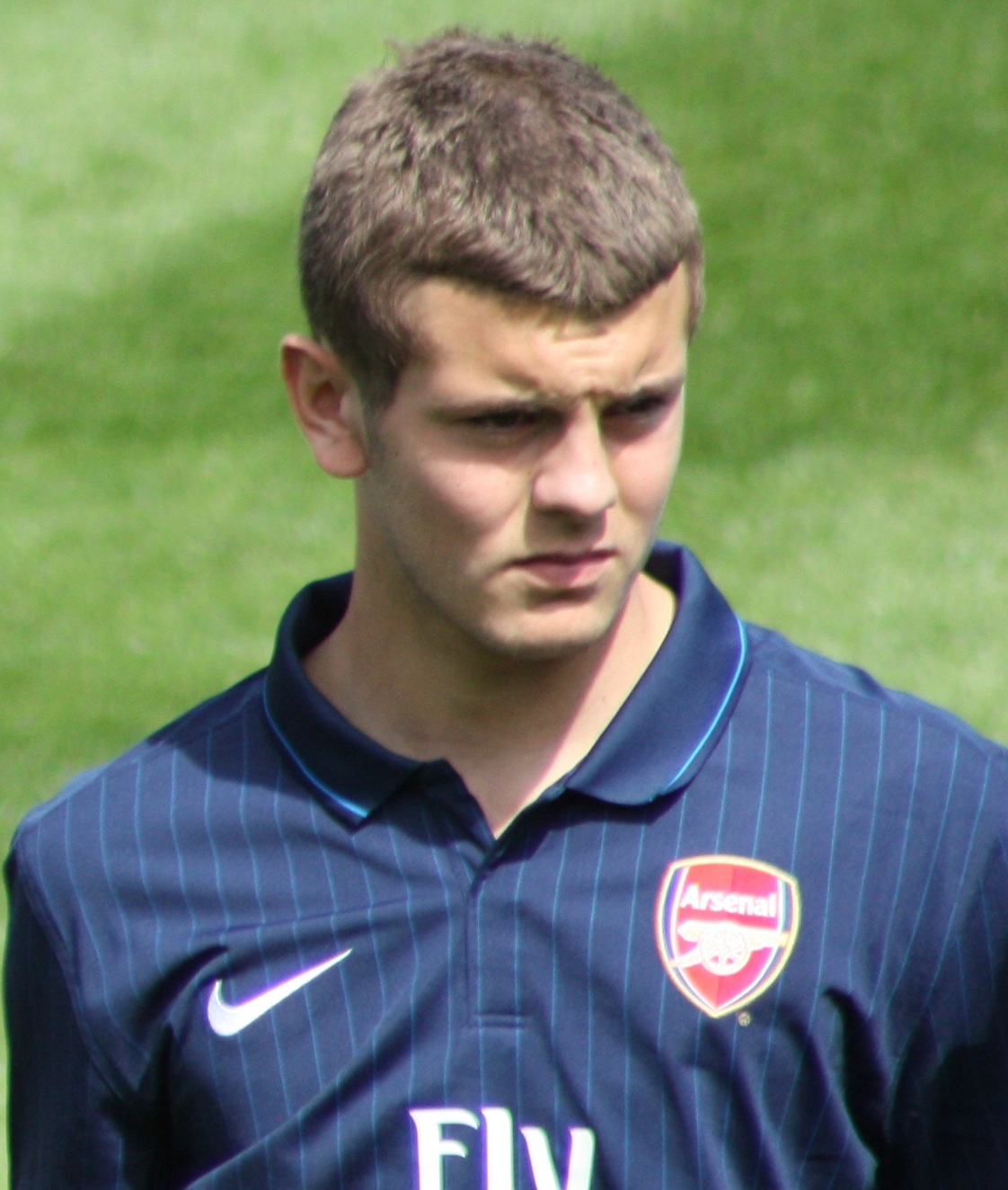
Jack Wilshere

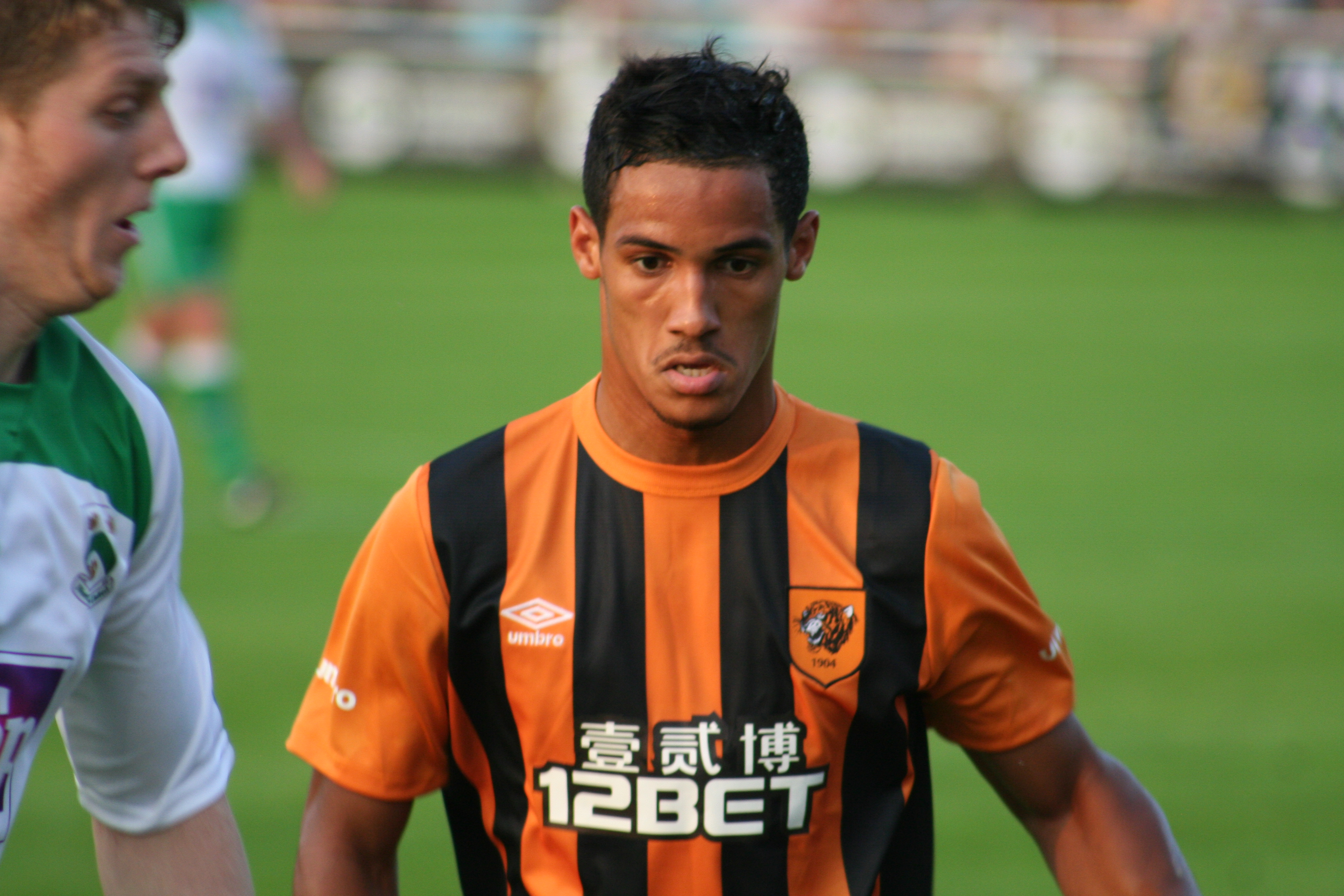
Tom Ince

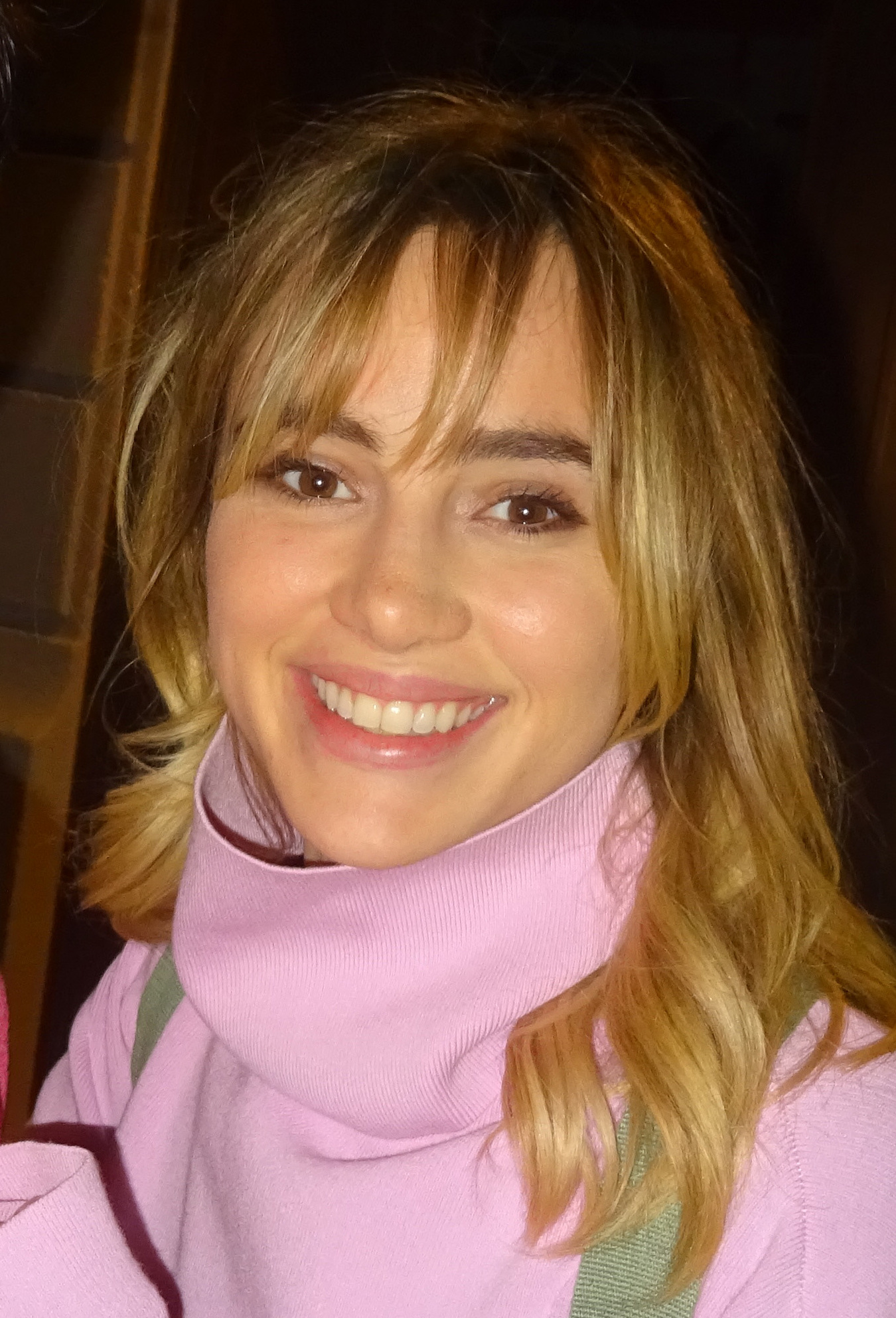
Suki Waterhouse

- 1 January
  - Corey Barnes, footballer
  - Andrai Jones, footballer
  - Jack Wilshere, footballer
- 3 January – Daniel McLay, New Zealand born racing cyclist
- 4 January – Jamie Griffiths, footballer
- 5 January
  - Louis Almond, footballer
  - Suki Waterhouse, model and actress
- 8 January – Kenny McLean, footballer
- 12 January – Georgia May Jagger, model
- 14 January – Tom Eaves, footballer
- 15 January – John Bostock, footballer
- 16 January – Josh Dawkin, footballer
- 22 January – Reece Connolly, footballer
- 24 January – Becky Downie, gymnast
- 25 January – Mark Andrews, pro wrestler
- 30 January – Tom Ince, footballer
- 31 January – James Hurst, footballer
- 31 January – Amy Jackson, model and actress

=== February ===
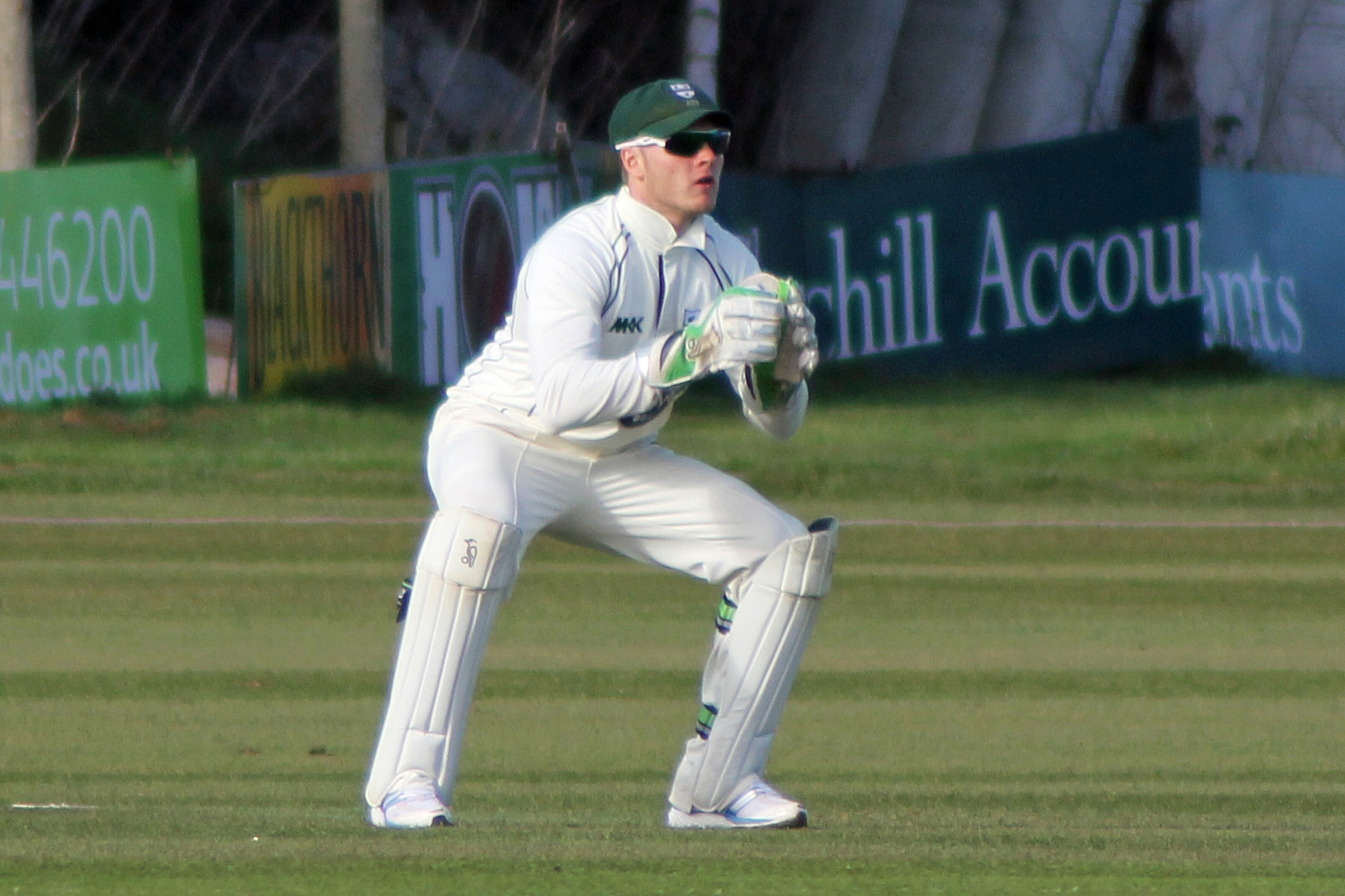
Ben Cox

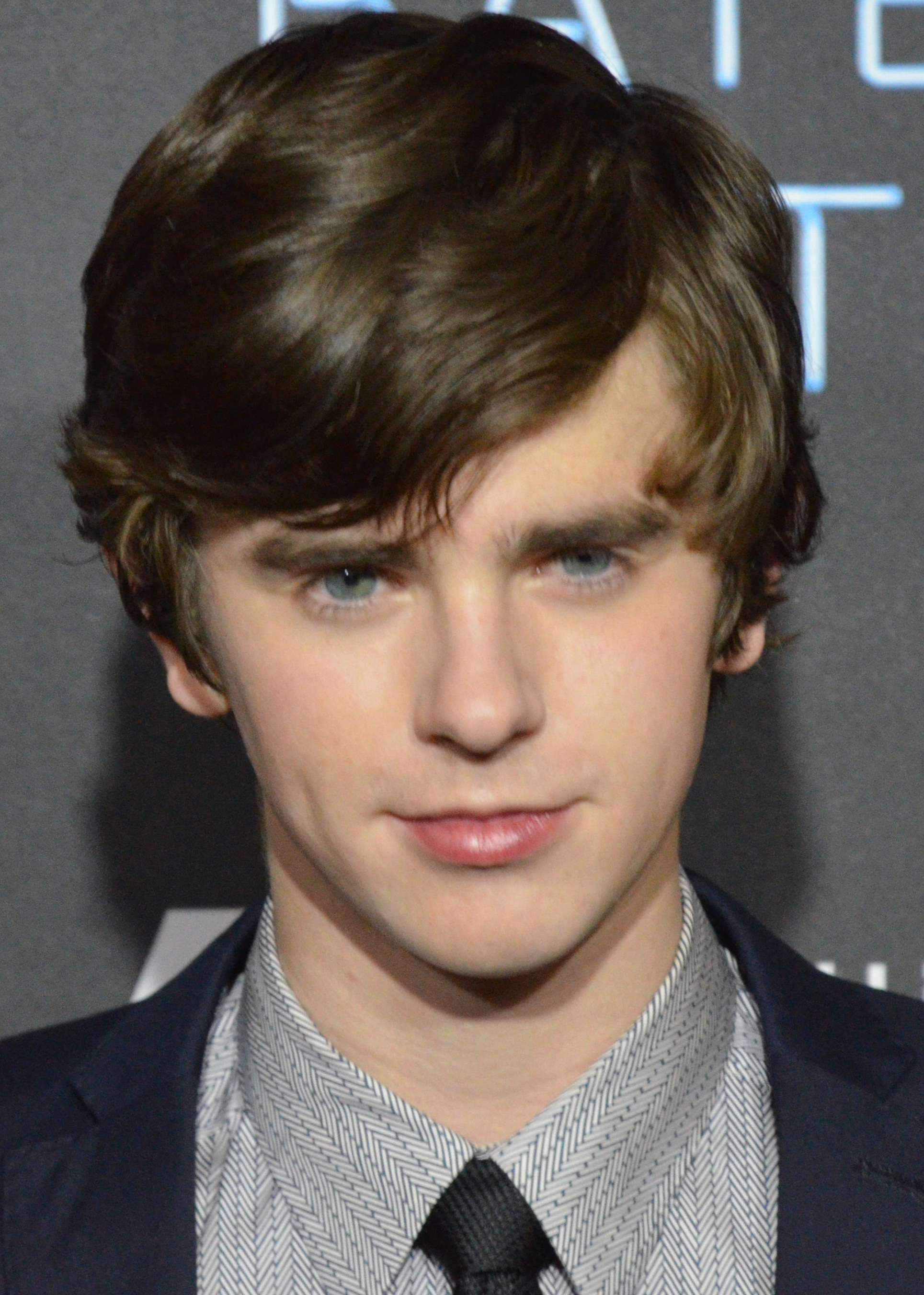
Freddie Highmore

- 1 February
  - Kamil Ahmet Çörekçi, footballer
  - Lewis Horner, footballer
- 2 February – Ben Cox, cricketer
- 7 February – Jose Baxter, footballer
- 8 February – Carl Jenkinson, footballer
- 9 February – Josh Fuller, footballer
- 10 February – Misha B, singer
- 11 February
  - Blair Dunlop, actor and musician
  - Georgia Groome, actress
- 14 February – Freddie Highmore, actor
- 17 February – Reiss Beckford, gymnast
- 18 February – Rhys Owen Davies, actor
- 20 February – Sam Mantom, footballer
- 21 February
  - Chris Brown, footballer
  - Phil Jones, footballer
- 27 February
  - Ryan Jack, footballer
  - Jonjo Shelvey, footballer
  - Callum Wilson, footballer

=== March ===
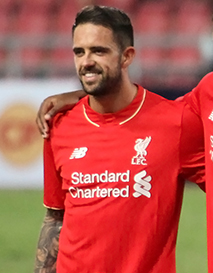
Danny Ings

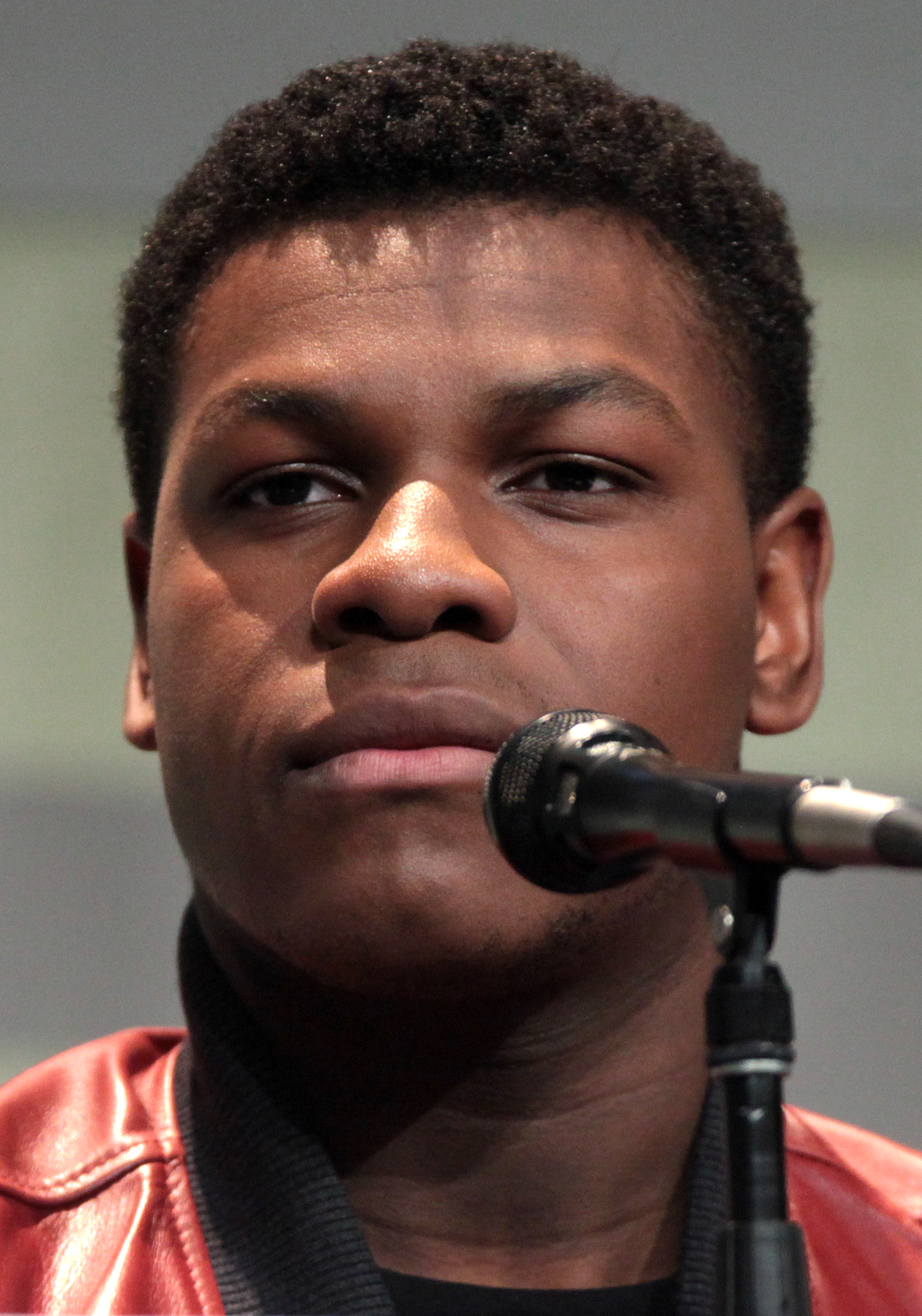
John Boyega

- 2 March – Maisie Richardson-Sellers, actress
- 4 March
  - Kieran Duffie, footballer
  - Daniel Lloyd, racing car driver
- 5 March – Amber Anderson, actress
- 7 March – Bel Powley, actress
- 10 March – Andy Hutchinson, footballer
- 12 March – Chris Atkinson, footballer
- 13 March
  - George MacKay, actor
  - Antoni Sarcevic, footballer
  - Kaya Scodelario, actress and model
- 15 March – Anna Shaffer, actress
- 16 March
  - Danny Ings, footballer
  - Michael Perham, youngest person to sail the Atlantic Ocean single-handed
- 17 March
  - Eliza Hope Bennett, actress and singer
  - John Boyega, British film actor
- 22 March – Luke Freeman, footballer
- 23 March – Lewis Burton, tennis player and model
- 24 March – Billy Bodin, footballer
- 25 March – Craig Lynch, footballer
- 27 March – Mark Gillespie, footballer

=== April ===
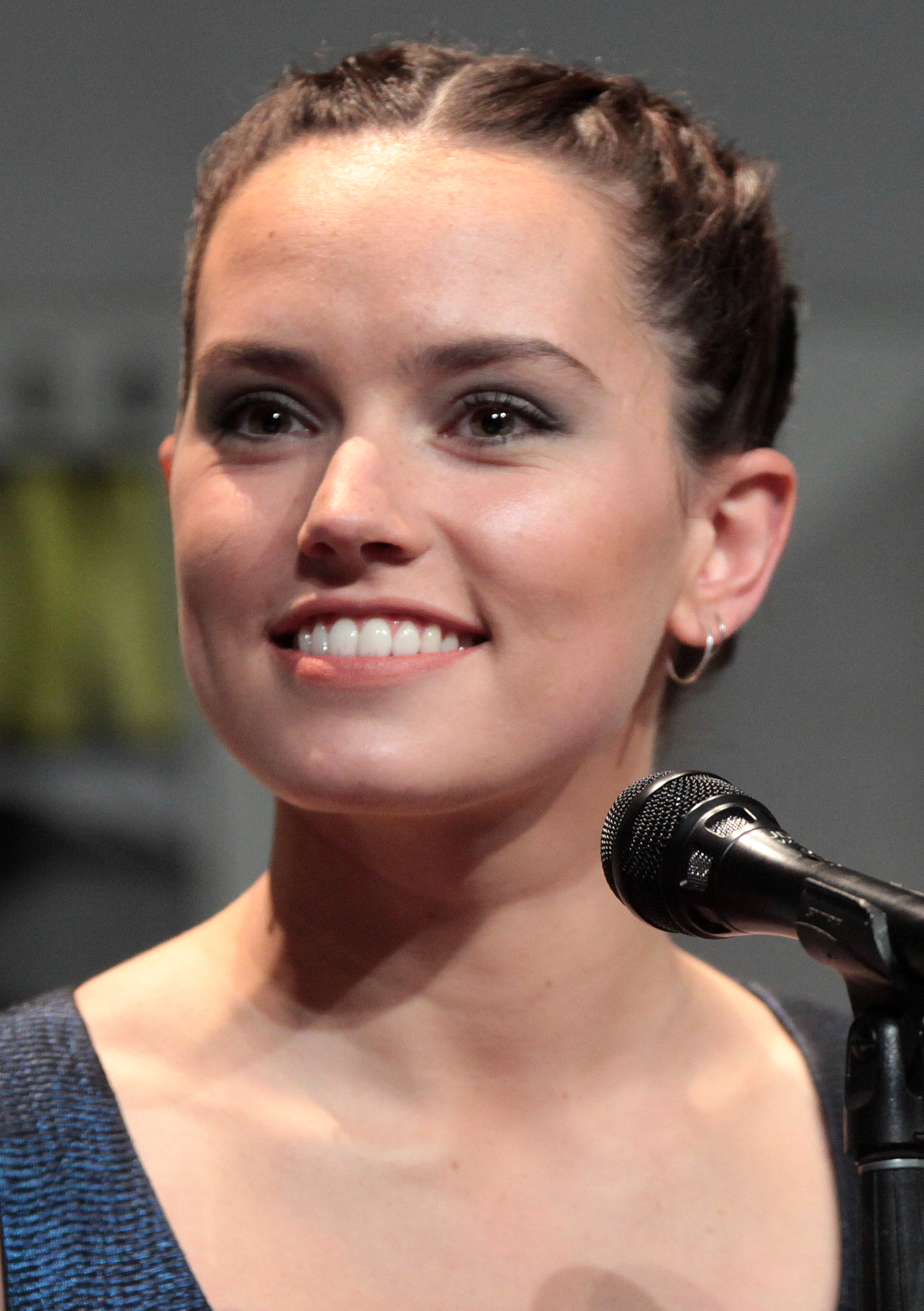
Daisy Ridley

- 4 April – Lucy May Barker, stage and screen actress
- 9 April – LD, drill rapper
- 10 April – Daisy Ridley, actress
- 11 April – Rod McDonald, footballer
- 12 April – The Vivienne, drag performer (d. 2025)
- 13 April – George North, rugby union player
- 14 April – Shaun Jeffers, footballer
- 15 April – Kayleden Brown, footballer
- 19 April – Nick Pope, footballer
- 20 April – Andy Halls, footballer
- 21 April
  - George Burgess, English rugby league player
  - Tom Burgess, English rugby league player
  - Mark Cullen, footballer
- 24 April – Laura Trott, track and road cyclist
- 26 April – Danielle Hope, actress and singer
- 28 April – Abdulai Bell-Baggie, footballer

=== May ===
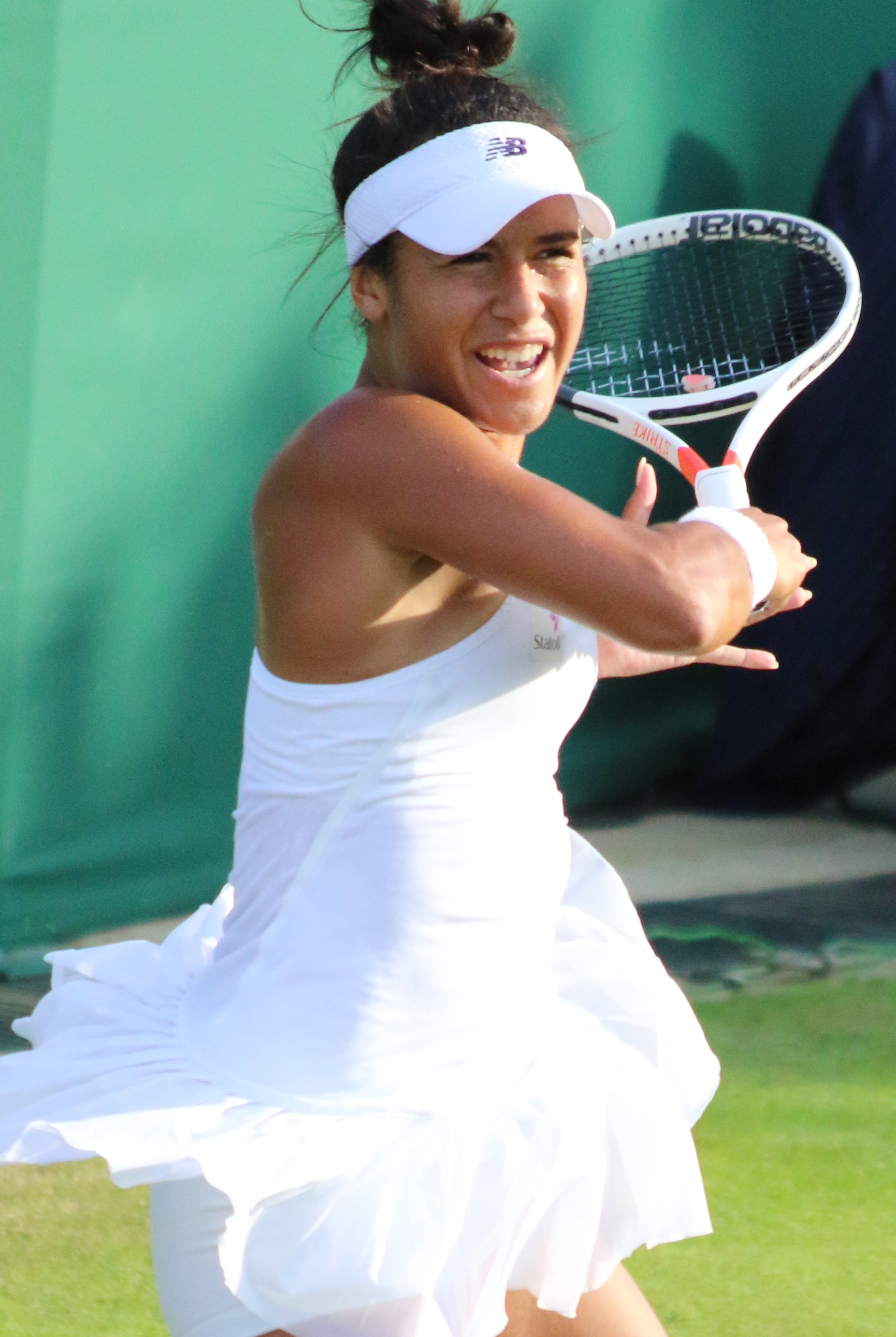
Heather Watson

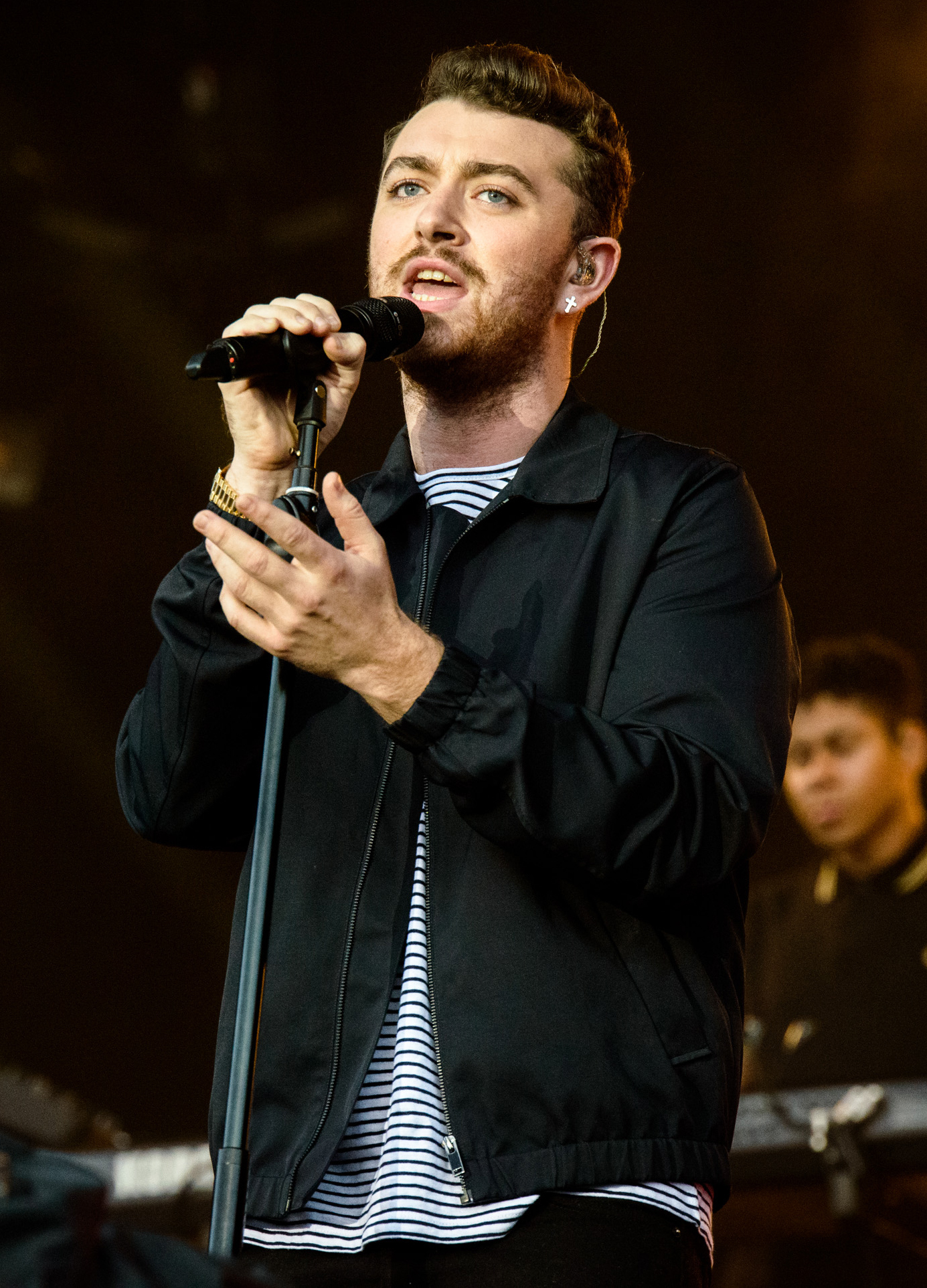
Sam Smith

- 1 May – James Hasson, Irish-Australian rugby league player
- 5 May – Craig Clay, footballer
- 8 May – Ana Mulvoy-Ten, actress
- 9 May – Dan Burn, footballer
- 14 May
  - Laya Lewis, actress
- 16 May
  - John Marquis, footballer
- 19 May
  - Sam Smith, singer
  - Eleanor Tomlinson, actress
  - Heather Watson, tennis player
- 24 May
  - Aidan Chippendale, footballer
  - Lewis Gregory, cricketer
  - Ryan Leonard, footballer
- 25 May – Callum McNish, footballer
- 26 May – Nathan Koranteng, footballer
- 28 May – Tom Carroll, footballer
- 29 May – Gregg Sulkin, actor

=== June ===
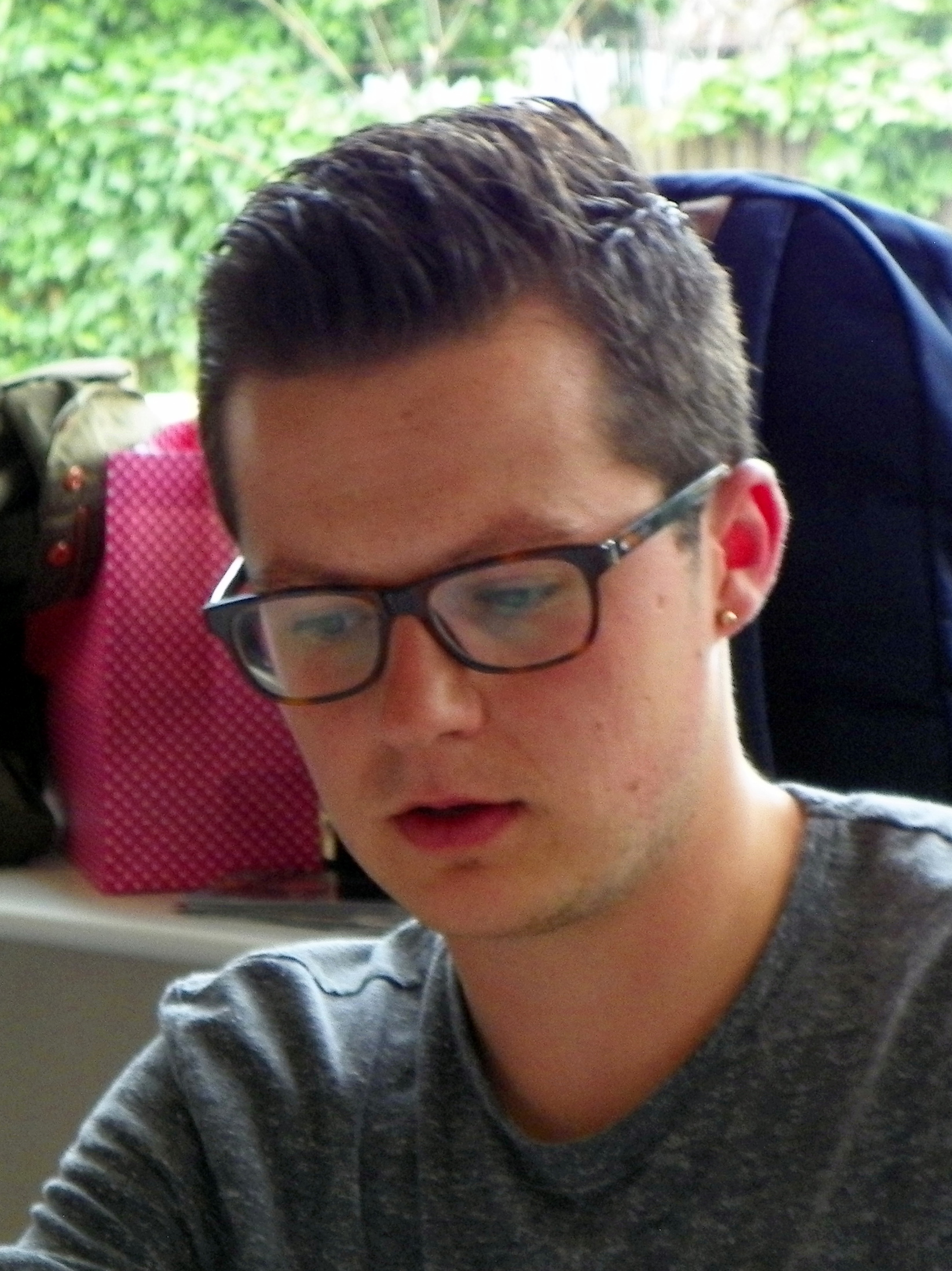
Harry Reid

Tom Fisher

- 1 June
  - Felix Drake, actor and bass guitar
  - Lateef Elford-Alliyu, Nigeria-born footballer
- 3 June – Chris Kendall, rugby league referee
- 4 June
  - Carl Forster, rugby league player
  - Brooke Vincent, actress
- 5 June – Nathan Byrne, footballer
- 9 June – Lucien Laviscount, actor and recording artist
- 11 June – Jordanne Whiley, English tennis player
- 12 June – Laura Jones, gymnast
- 20 June – Curtis Main, footballer
- 23 June – Harry Reid, actor
- 24 June – Stuart Hogg, Scottish rugby union player
- 26 June – Zander Clark, Scottish footballer
- 28 June – Tom Fisher, footballer

=== July ===
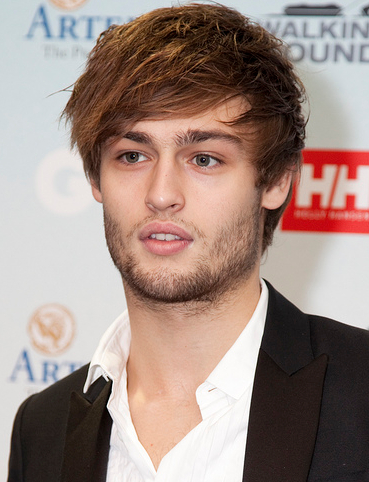
Douglas Booth

- 1 July
  - Theo Cowan, actor
  - Ben Greenhalgh, footballer
  - Hannah Whelan, gymnast
- 5 July – Max Brick, diver
- 8 July
  - Kelsey-Beth Crossley, actress
  - Benjamin Grosvenor, classical pianist
- 9 July – Douglas Booth, actor
- 13 July – Bryan Parry, Welsh actor
- 17 July – Adam Davies, Welsh footballer
- 21 July – Jessica Barden, actress
- 23 July – Danny Ings, footballer
- 25 July – Peter Gregory, footballer
- 27 July – Tom Bradshaw, footballer
- 28 July – George Spencer-Churchill, Earl of Sunderland
- 30 July – Kevin Grocott, footballer

=== August ===
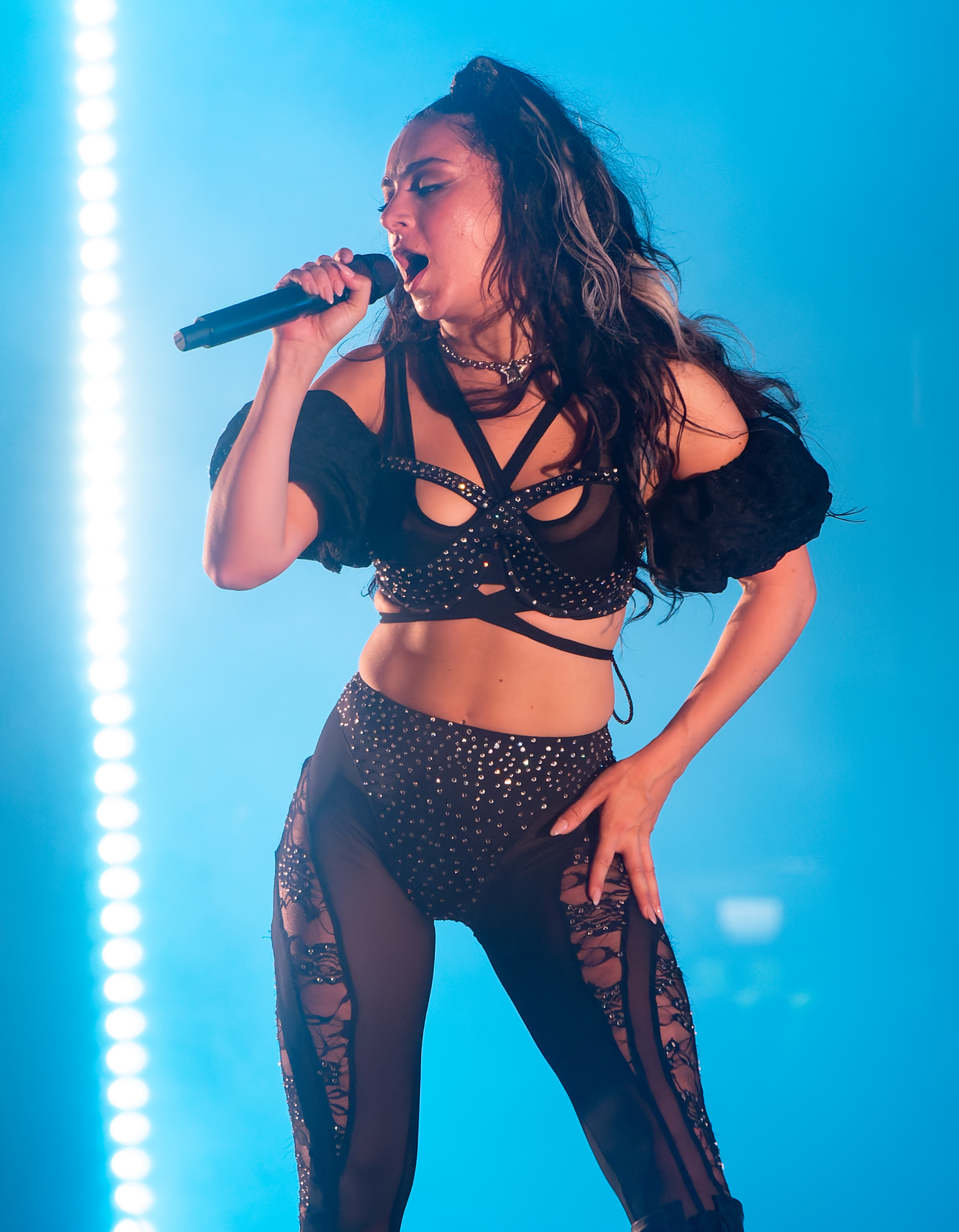
Charli XCX

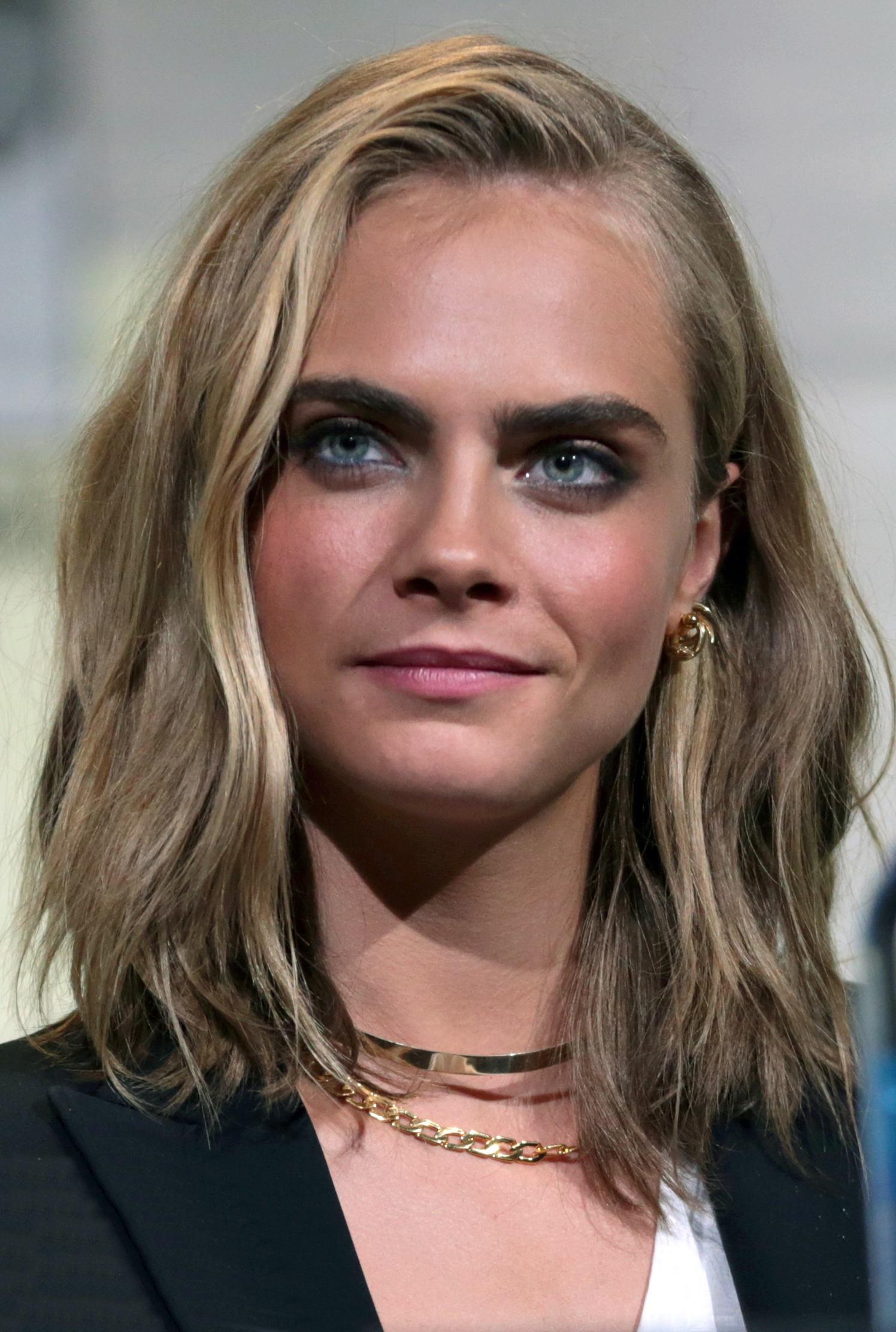
Cara Delevingne

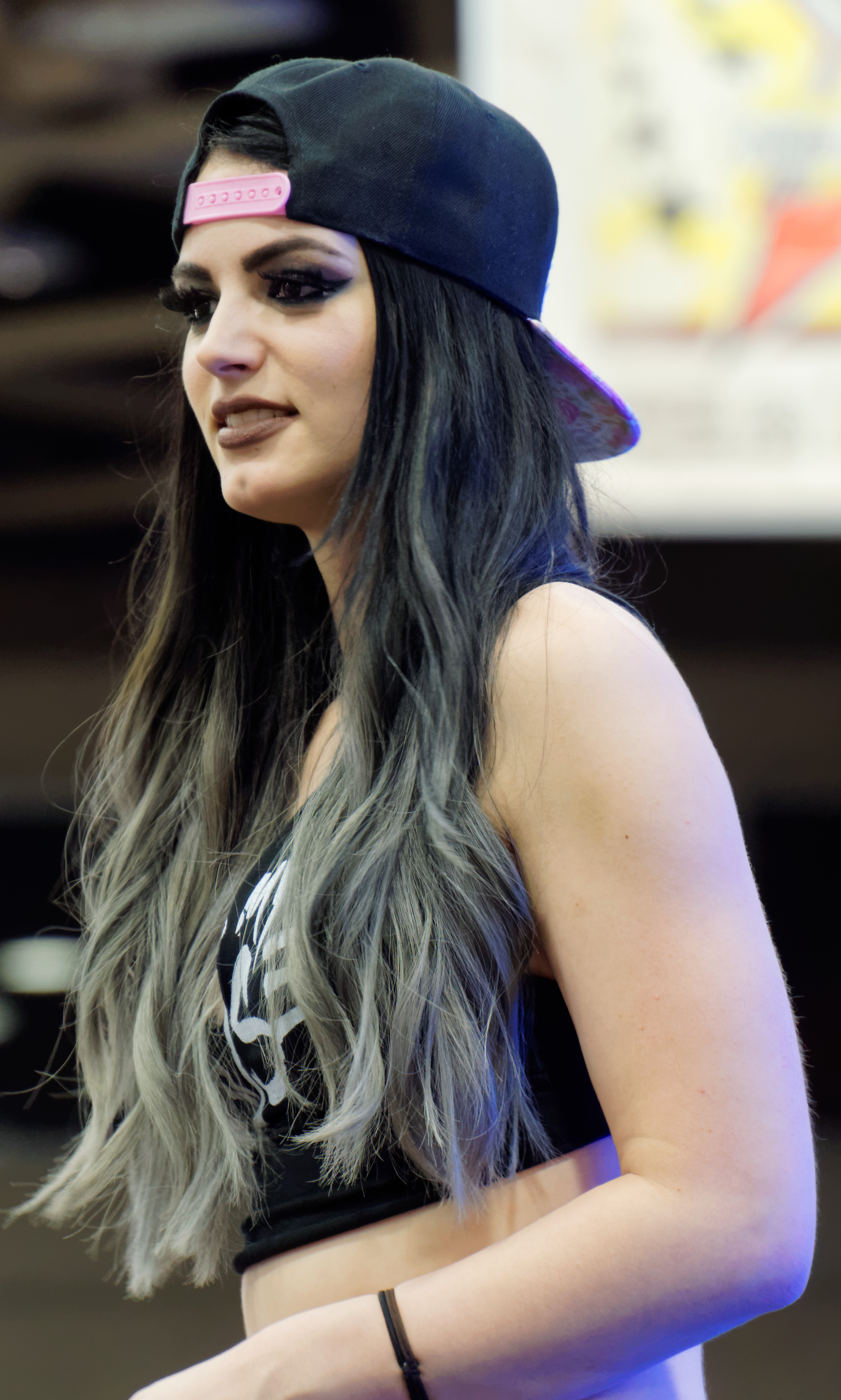
Saraya

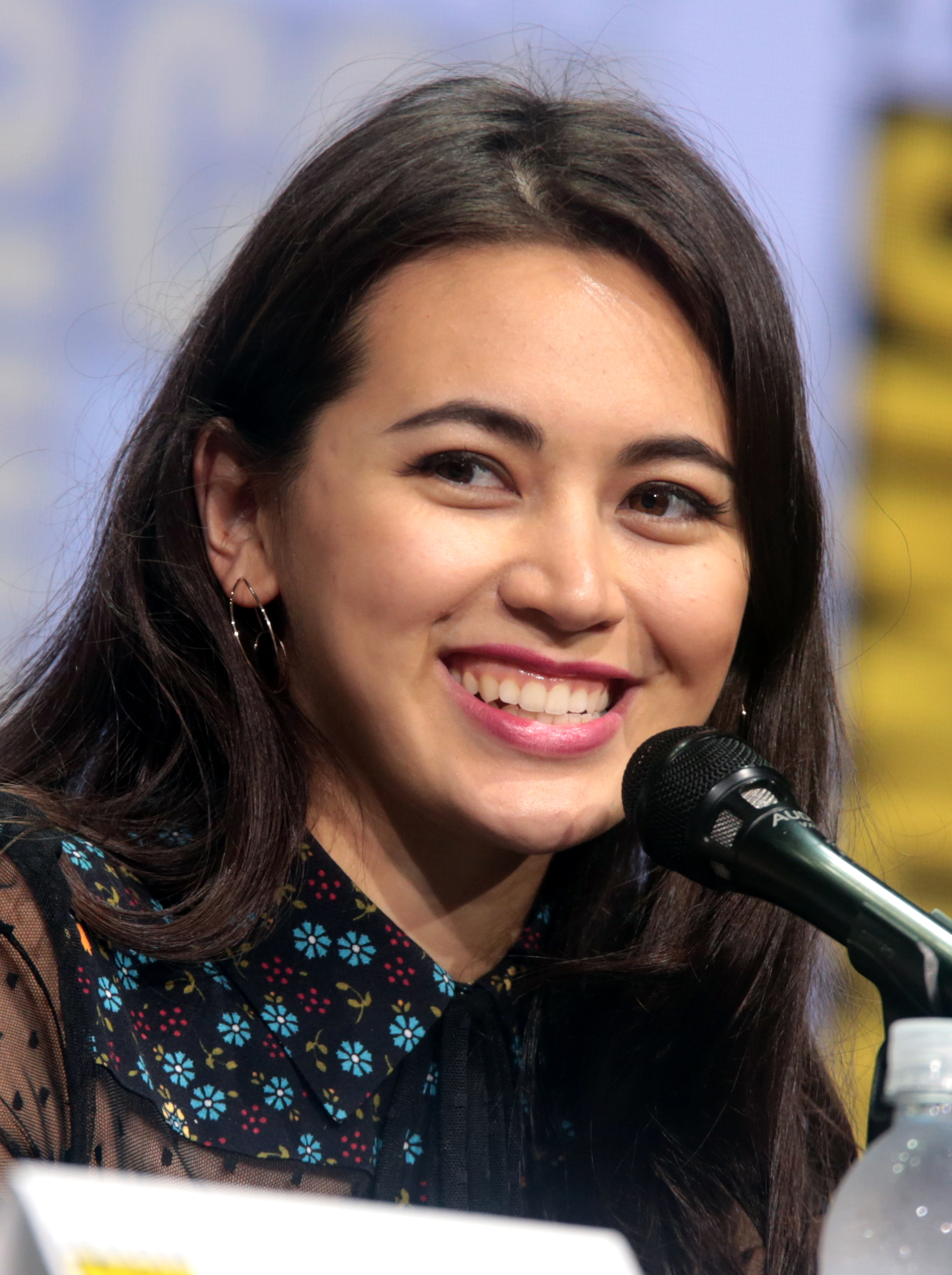
Jessica Henwick

- 2 August
  - Charli XCX, singer and songwriter
  - Greg Austin, actor
  - Sam Thompson, television personality
- 4 August – S-X, musician
- 10 August – Oliver Rowland, racing driver
- 12 August – Cara Delevingne, model and actress
- 13 August – Keanu Marsh-Brown, footballer
- 17 August – Saraya, professional wrestler
- 18 August – Amy Willerton, model
- 21 August – Brad Kavanagh, actor and singer-songwriter
- 30 August – Jessica Henwick, actress
- 31 August – Holly Earl, actress

=== September ===
- 2 September – Cameron Darkwah, footballer
- 4 September – Zerkaa, YouTuber
- 7 September – Simon Minter, YouTuber
- 9 September – Cameron Crighton, actor
- 12 September – Jordan Burrow, footballer
- 16 September
  - Jessica Plummer, actress and singer
  - Jake Roche, actor and singer
- 17 September – William Buller, driver
- 20 September – Will Addison, rugby union player
- 21 September – Arlissa, Germany-born singer-songwriter
- 22 September – Philip Hindes, Germany-born cyclist
- 23 September
  - Matthew Harriott, footballer
  - Finn Russell, rugby union player
- 28 September
  - Kristian Cox, footballer
  - Keir Gilchrist, actor
- 30 September – Cyrus Christie, footballer

=== October ===
- 5 October – Alex Prior, composer
- 7 October – Kane Ferdinand, footballer
- 9 October – Kofi Lockhart-Adams, footballer
- 10 October – Gabrielle Aplin, singer-songwriter
- 22 October
  - 21 Savage, British-born rapper based in the U.S.
  - Carrie Hope Fletcher, actress
- 26 October – Johnny Gorman, footballer
- 29 October
  - Jacqueline Jossa, actress
  - Brad Singleton, rugby league player

=== November ===
- November – Maia Krall Fry, actress and director
- 1 November – Alexander Davidson, rugby league player
- 2 November – Naomi Ackie, actress
- 5 November – Cameron Lancaster, footballer
- 6 November – Robert Aramayo, actor
- 14 November – Nathan Fox, English footballer
- 15 November – Tom Coulton, footballer
- 20 November – Michael Doughty, footballer
- 21 November – Conor Maynard, singer
- 22 November – Lauren Bruton, female football striker
- 28 November – Sophie Moulds, Welsh television host, model, and beauty queen
- 30 November – Samson Lee, Welsh rugby union player

=== December ===
- 2 December - Reece Lyne, rugby league player
- 3 December – Joseph McManners, actor
- 15 December – Jesse Lingard, footballer
- 17 December – Thomas Law, actor
- 18 December – Connor Goldson, football defender
- 21 December
  - Dale Jennings, football striker
  - Isobel Pooley, high jumper
- 22 December – Chris Hughes, TV personality
- 24 December – Melissa Suffield, actress
- 26 December – Jade Thirlwall, recording artist, member of Little Mix
- 30 December – Lacey Banghard, model

== Deaths ==
=== January ===
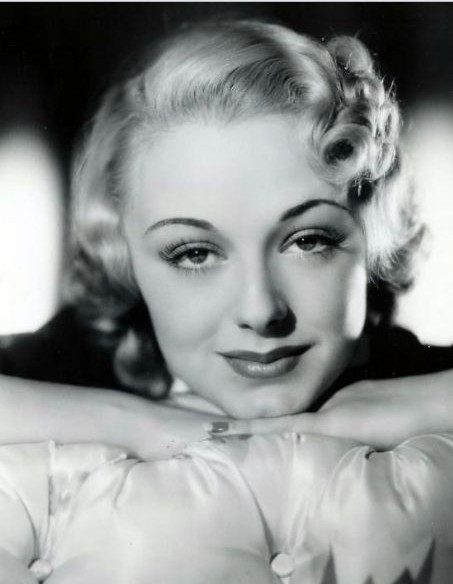
Virginia Field

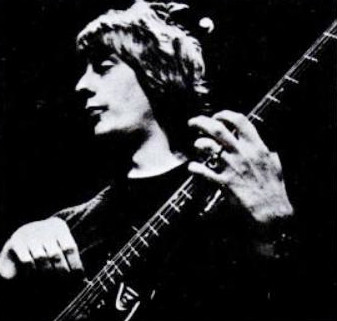
Dee Murray

- 1 January – James W. B. Douglas, social researcher (born 1914)
- 2 January
  - Joyce Butler, Labour Co-operative member of parliament (born 1910)
  - Virginia Field, actress (born 1917)
- 4 January – Patrick Gallacher, Scottish footballer (born 1909)
- 8 January – Anthony Dawson, actor (born 1916)
- 9 January – Bill Naughton, playwright (born 1910)
- 10 January – Barbara Couper, actress (born 1903)
- 11 January – W. G. Hoskins, historian (born 1908)
- 15 January – Dee Murray, bassist (Elton John Band) (born 1946)
- 16 January – Shelagh Roberts, politician (born 1924)
- 23 January
  - Freddie Bartholomew, actor (born 1924)
  - Harry Mortimer, musician and composer (born 1902)
- 25 January – Kay Beauchamp, communist activist and feminist (born 1899)
- 27 January – Dame Gwen Ffrangcon-Davies, actress (born 1891)
- 30 January – George Frederick James Temple, mathematician (born 1901)

=== February ===
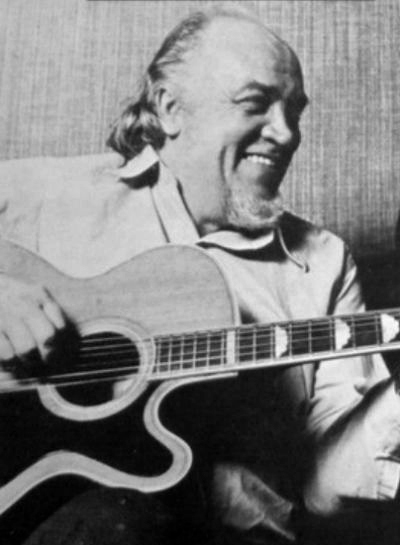
Denny Wright

- 2 February – Theodor Gaster, biblical scholar (born 1906)
- 4 February – Alan Davies, footballer (born 1961); suicide
- 8 February – Denny Wright, jazz guitarist (born 1924)
- 6 February – John Greenstock, English cricketer (born 1905)
- 9 February – Leon Clore, film producer (born 1918)
- 16 February
  - Angela Carter, novelist and journalist (born 1940)
  - George MacBeth, poet and novelist (born 1932)
  - Charles Carnegie, 11th Earl of Southesk, peer (born 1893)
- 17 February – John Fieldhouse, Baron Fieldhouse, First Sea Lord (born 1928)
- 18 February – Robert Gittings, author, playwright and poet (born 1911)
- 24 February
  - Clarrie Jordan, English footballer (born 1922)
  - Doreen Montgomery, screenwriter (born 1913)
- 25 February – Guy Deghy, actor (born 1912, Austria-Hungary)
- 27 February – John Rothenstein, art historian (born 1902)
- 29 February – Ruth Pitter, poet (born 1897)

=== March ===
- 1 March – Howard Payne, hammer thrower (born 1931)
- 2 March – Jackie Mudie, footballer (born 1930)
- 3 March – G. L. S. Shackle, economist (born 1903)
- 5 March – Peter Hadland Davis, botanist (born 1918)
- 6 March – Hugh Gibb, musician, father of the Bee Gees (born 1916)
- 12 March
  - Max Catto, playwright and novelist (born 1907)
  - Sir Harold Hobson, drama critic and author (born 1904)
  - Phyllis Stanley, actress (born 1914)
- 14 March – Elfrida Vipont, children's author (born 1902)
- 18 March
  - Arnold Diamond, actor (born 1915); road accident
  - Jack Kelsey, footballer (born 1929)
- 19 March – Oscar Gugen, diver (born 1910)
- 22 March
  - Gruffydd Evans, Baron Evans of Claughton, politician and solicitor (born 1928)
  - Melissa Stribling, actress (born 1926)
- 26 March – Arthur Lees, golfer (born 1928)
- 27 March – Leueen MacGrath, actress (born 1914)
- 29 March
  - Christopher Hawkes, archaeologist (born 1905)
  - John Spencer, 8th Earl Spencer, peer and father of Diana, Princess of Wales (born 1924)
- 30 March – Winnie Shaw, tennis player (born 1947)

=== April ===
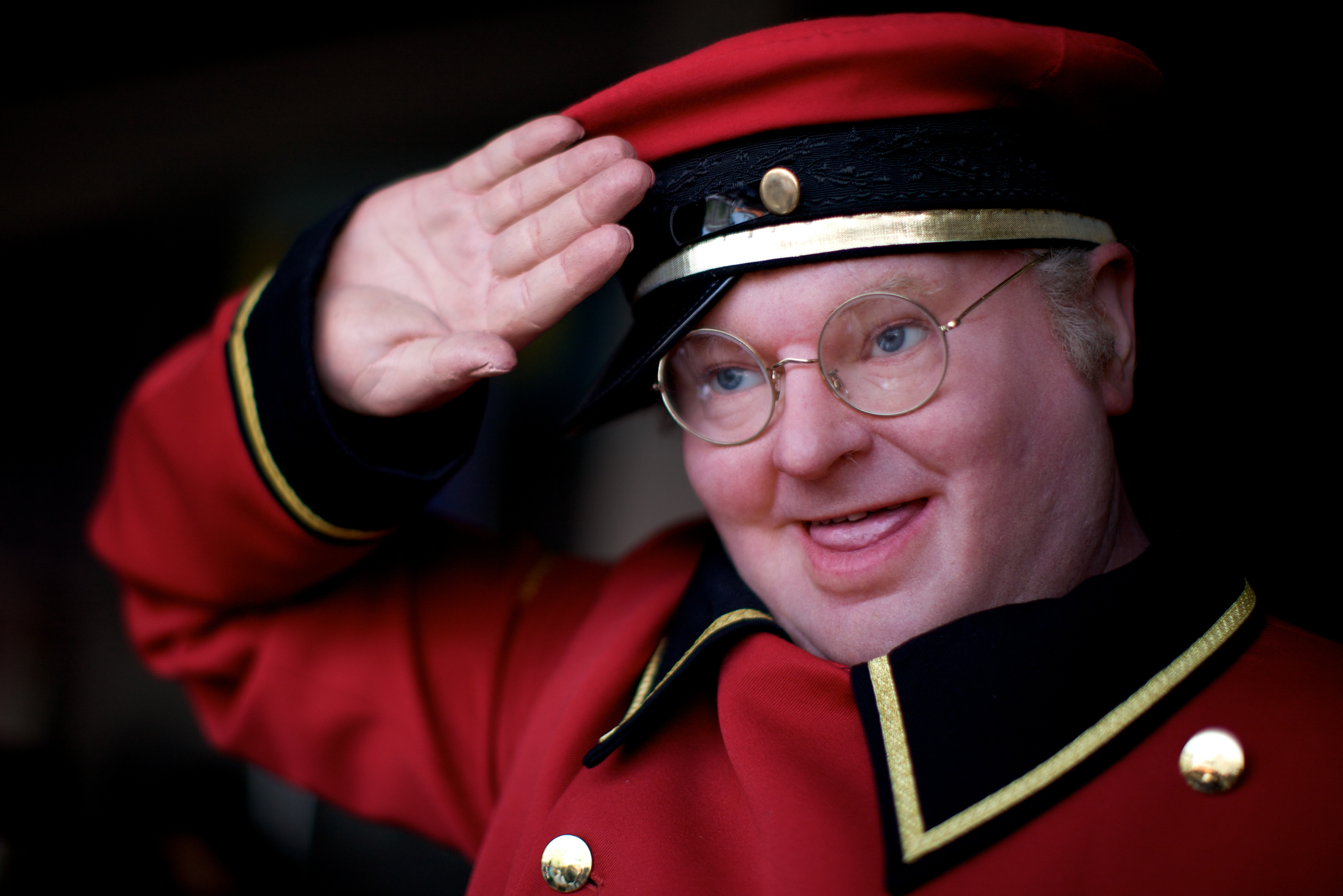
Benny Hill

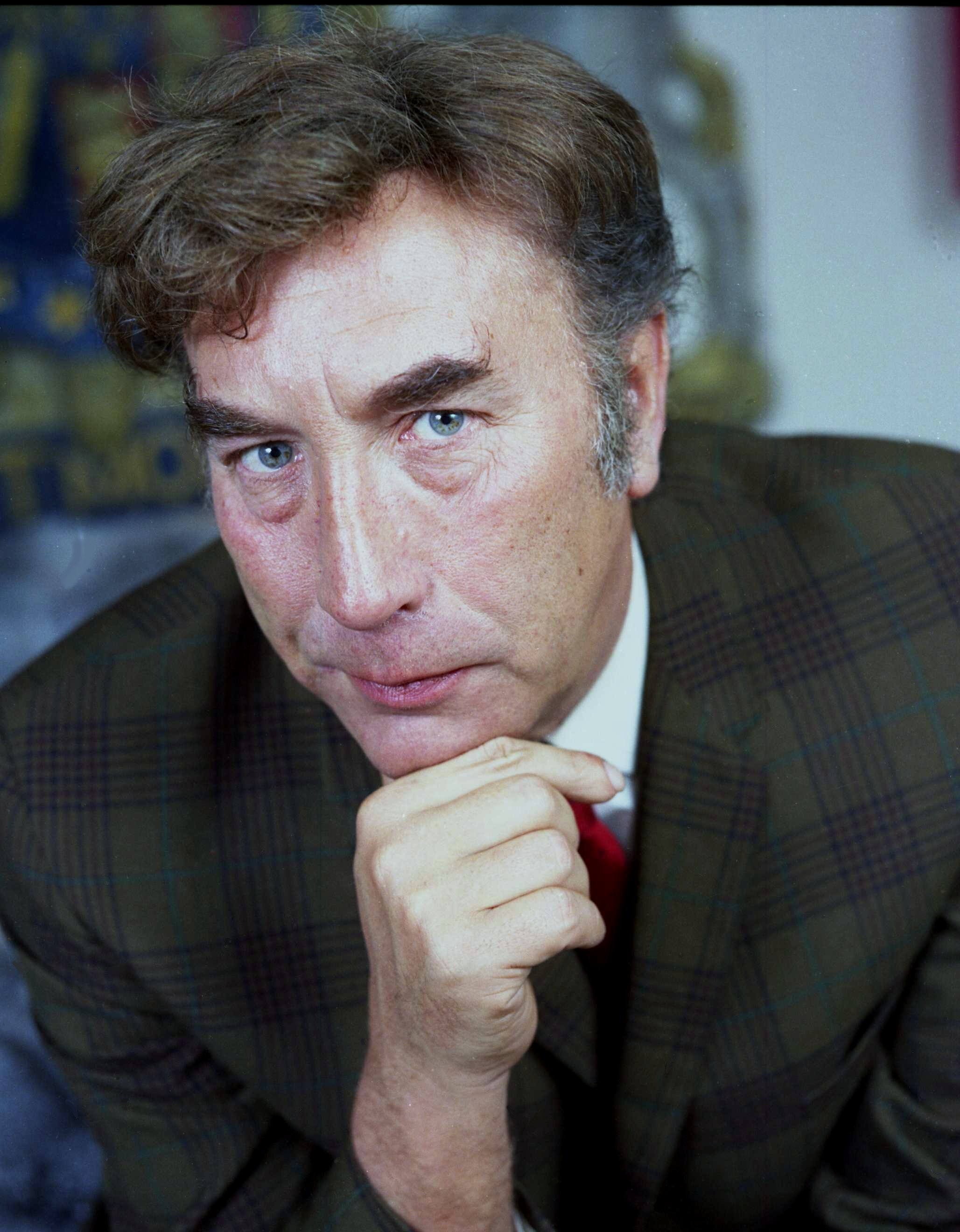
Frankie Howerd

- 1 April
  - Michael Havers, Baron Havers, lawyer and politician (born 1923)
  - Nigel Preston, drummer (The Cult) (born 1962); drug overdose
  - Edward Smouha, athlete (born 1908)
- 6 April – Sir Peter Hayman, diplomat and paedophile (born 1914)
- 8 April – Ronald Eyre, theatre director (born 1929)
- 10 April – Peter D. Mitchell, biochemist (born 1920)
- 11 April – Adele Dixon, actress and singer (born 1908)
- 13 April
  - C. P. Fitzgerald, writer and historian (born 1902)
  - Brian Oulton, actor (born 1908)
- 16 April – Gilbert Alsop, English footballer (born 1908)
- 18 April
  - Benny Hill, comedian and actor (born 1924)
  - H. V. Kershaw, television scriptwriter (born 1918)
- 19 April – Frankie Howerd, comedian and actor (born 1917)
- 20 April
  - Peter Murray, art historian (born 1920)
  - Llewellyn Thomas, physicist and applied mathematician (born 1903)
- 21 April – Nigel Williams, conservator (born 1944)
- 26 April – Julian Amyes, film director (born 1917)
- 27 April – James Maude Richards, architectural writer (born 1907)
- 28 April – Francis Bacon, painter (born 1909, Ireland)
- 29 April – Stephen Oliver, composer (born 1950)

=== May ===
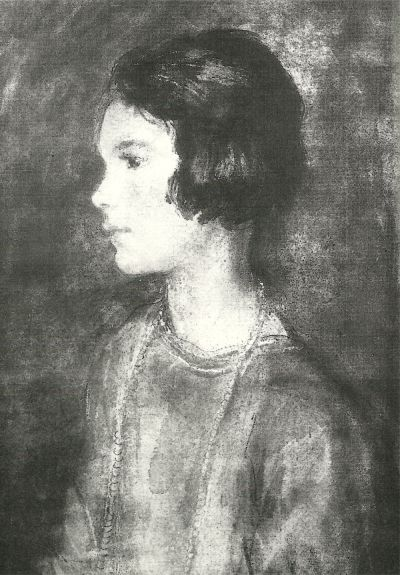
Elizabeth David

- 4 May
  - Gregor Mackenzie, Labour politician (born 1927)
  - Lyn Marshall, yoga teacher, ballerina and actress (born 1944)
- 9 May – Robert Docker, composer (born 1918)
- 13 May
  - Stan Hugill, musician (born 1906)
  - F. E. McWilliam, sculptor (born 1909)
- 15 May – Bartlett Mullins, actor (born 1904)
- 16 May
  - Eric James, Baron James of Rusholme, educator (born 1909)
  - Sir Robert Grainger Ker Thompson, RAF officer and counter-insurgency expert (born 1916)
- 18 May – Eleanor Mears, medical practitioner and campaigner (born 1917)
- 22 May – Elizabeth David, cookery writer (born 1913)
- 24 May
  - Francis Thomas Bacon, chemical engineer (born 1904)
  - Joan Sanderson, actress (born 1912)
- 26 May – Terence Clarke, Army officer and politician (born 1904)
- 27 May – Peter Jenkins, journalist (born 1934)
- 29 May – Ollie Halsall, guitarist (born 1949)

=== June ===
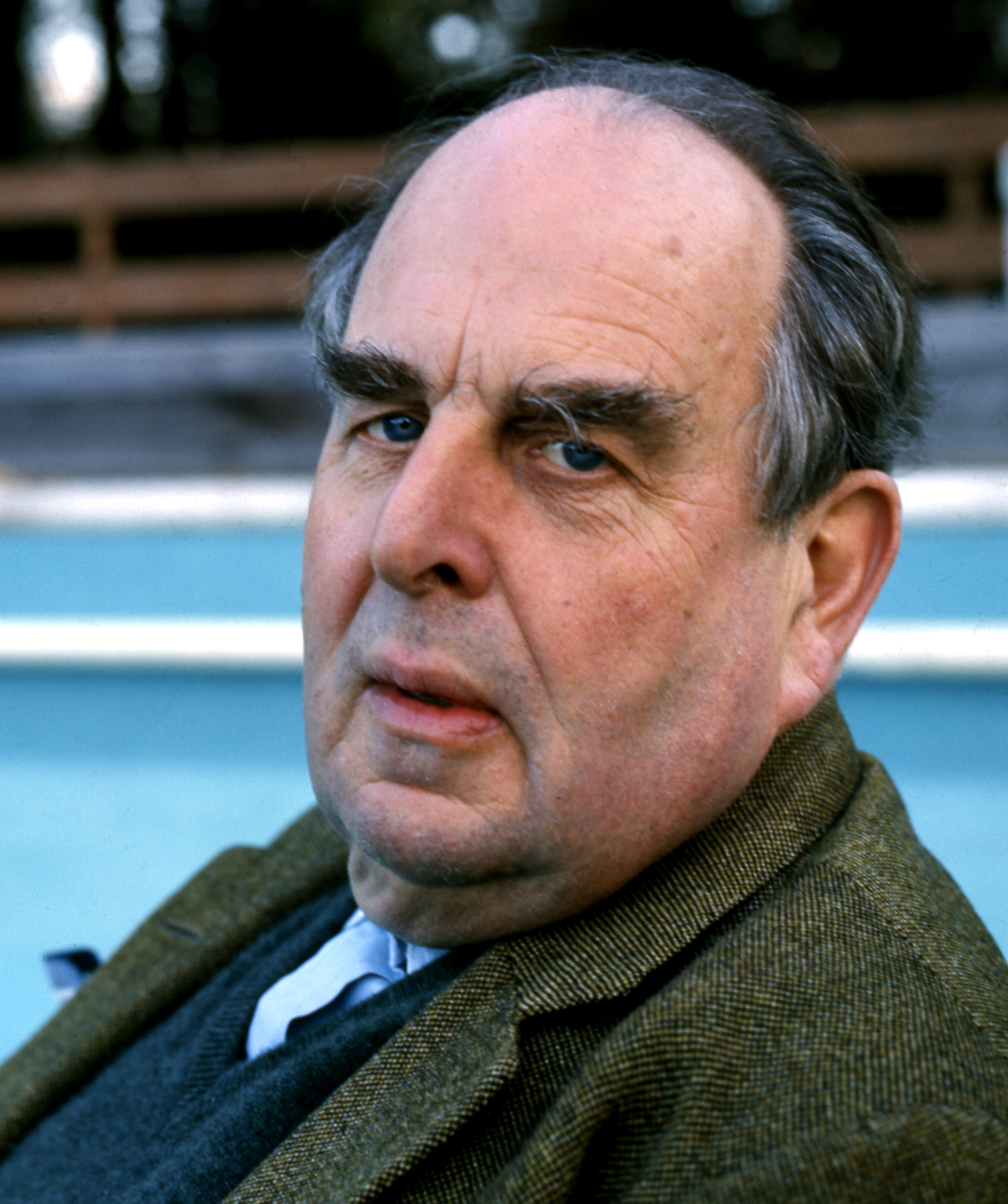
Robert Morley

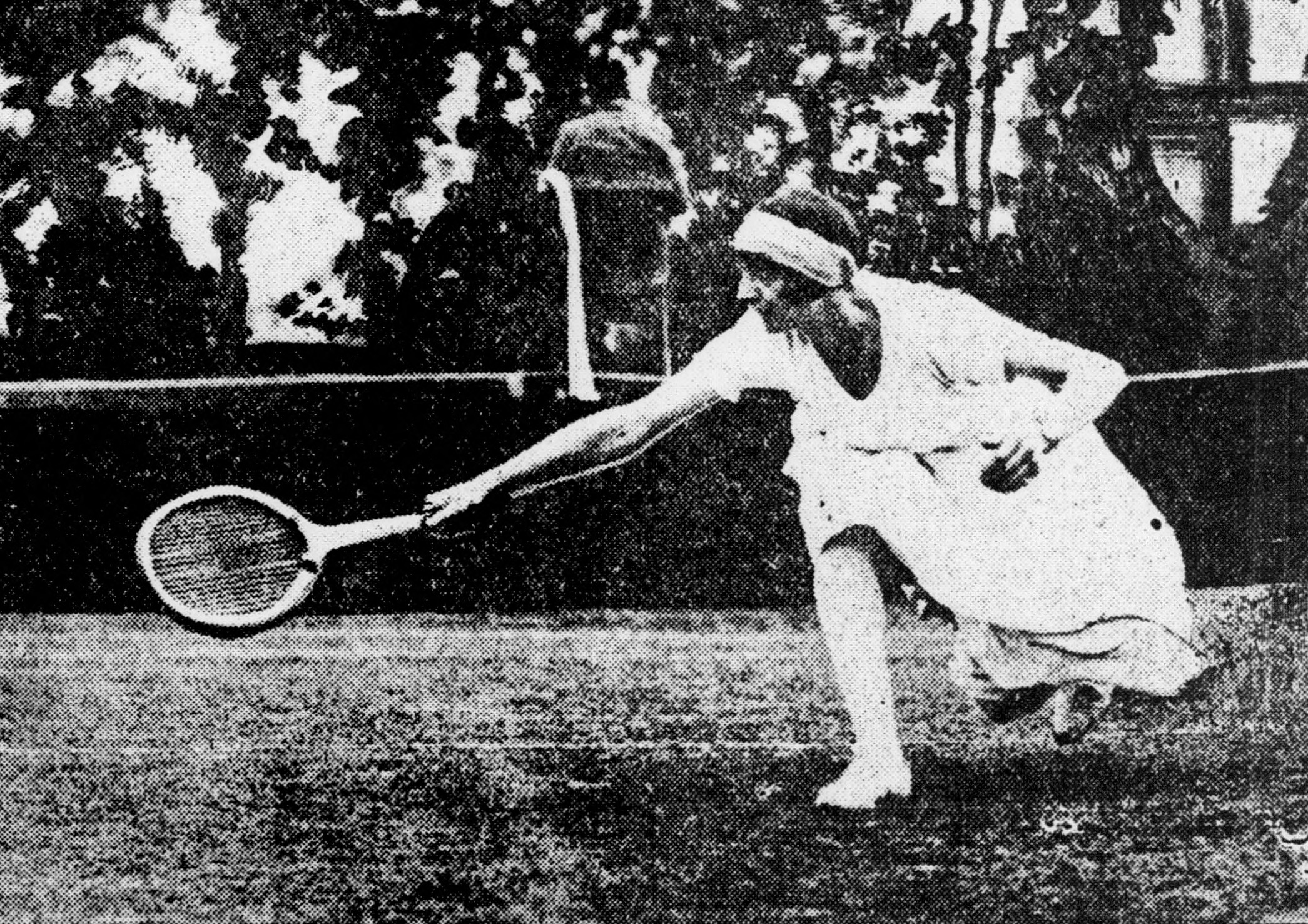
Kitty Godfree

- 1 June – Eve Gardiner, beautician and remedial make-up artist (born 1913)
- 3 June – Robert Morley, character actor (born 1908)
- 5 June – Laurence Naismith, actor (born 1908)
- 6 June – Richard Eurich, painter (born 1903)
- 10 June – Glyn Smallwood Jones, colonial administrator (born 1908)
- 16 June – Peter Legh, 4th Baron Newton, peer and politician (born 1915)
- 19 June – Kitty Godfree, tennis player, Wimbledon winner (1924, 1926) (born 1896)
- 20 June – Sir Charles Groves, conductor (born 1915)
- 22 June – Reg Harris, cyclist (born 1920)
- 23 June – John Spencer Churchill, artist (born 1909)
- 24 June – Jo Spence, photographer (born 1934)
- 25 June – James Stirling, architect (born 1926)
- 27 June – Bessie Watson, child suffragette and piper (born 1900)
- 28 June – John Piper, artist (born 1903)
- 29 June – Elie Kedourie, historian (born 1926, Iraq)
- 30 June
  - Henry Thynne, 6th Marquess of Bath, peer and politician (born 1905)
  - Massey Lopes, 2nd Baron Roborough, peer and Army officer (born 1903)

=== July ===
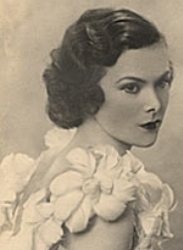
Anne Parsons, Countess of Rosse

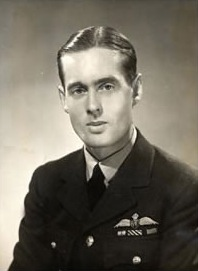
Leonard Cheshire

- 1 July – Jack Hood, boxer (born 1902)
- 3 July – Anne Parsons, Countess of Rosse, socialite (born 1902)
- 4 July – David Abercrombie, phonetician (born 1909)
- 5 July – Georgia Brown, singer and actress (born 1933)
- 6 July – Bryan Guinness, 2nd Baron Moyne, peer (born 1909)
- 10 July – Albert Pierrepoint, hangman (born 1905)
- 12 July
  - Reginald Beck, film editor (born 1902)
  - Ted Fenton, footballer and manager (born 1914); traffic accident
  - Sir Basil Smallpeice, businessman (b. 1906)
- 13 July – Christopher Ironside, painter and designer of the reverse of the original decimal coinage (born 1913)
- 14 July – Barbara Comyns, writer and artist (born 1907)
- 16 July – Jack Surtees, footballer (born 1911)
- 20 July – John Bratby, painter (born 1928)
- 22 July – Alexander McKee, journalist, military historian and diver, discoverer of the Mary Rose (born 1918)
- 23 July
  - Maxine Audley, actress (born 1923)
  - Robert Liddell, literary critic, biographer, novelist, travel writer and poet (born 1908)
  - Ian Proctor, boat designer (born 1918)
  - Rosemary Sutcliff, children's historical novelist (born 1920)
- 25 July – Gary Windo, jazz saxophonist (born 1941)
- 26 July
  - Janet Key, actress (born 1945)
  - Richard Martin Bingham, Member of Parliament and judge (born 1915)
- 29 July – William Mathias, composer (born 1934)
- 31 July – Leonard Cheshire, RAF pilot (born 1917)

=== August ===
- 1 August – Leslie Fox, mathematician (born 1918)
- 3 August – Don Lang, trombonist and singer (born 1925)
- 9 August
  - Patrick Devlin, Baron Devlin, judge (born 1905)
  - Sir David Llewellyn, politician (born 1916)
- 12 August – Patricia Harmsworth, Viscountess Rothermere, peer and actress (born 1929)
- 14 August – Harry Allen, hangman (born 1911)
- 17 August
  - John Maclay, 1st Viscount Muirshiel, politician (born 1905)
  - Tommy Nutter, fashion designer (born 1943)
  - Lady Rachel Pepys, Lady-in-Waiting to Princess Marina, Duchess of Kent (born 1905)
- 18 August – Simon Hartog, filmmaker (born 1940)
- 23 August
  - Sir David Hallifax, Royal Navy admiral, Constable and Governor of Windsor Castle (born 1927)
  - Donald Stewart, Scottish National Party Member of Parliament (born 1920)
- 25 August – Cyril Stanley Smith, metallurgist (born 1903)
- 28 August – Bedwyr Lewis Jones, scholar, literary critic and linguist (born 1933)
- 29 August
  - Mary Norton, author (born 1903)
  - Teddy Turner, actor (born 1917)

=== September ===
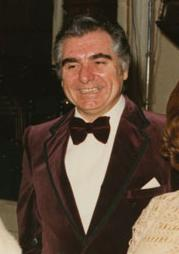
Sir Geraint Evans

- 2 September – Johnnie Mortimer, television scriptwriter (born 1931)
- 5 September – Christopher Trace, actor and television presenter (born 1933)
- 6 September
  - Mervyn Johns, actor (born 1899)
  - John Sutton, geologist (born 1919)
- 7 September – Cyril Bence, toolmaker and politician (born 1902)
- 8 September
  - Sir Guy Grantham, Royal Navy admiral (born 1900)
  - Donald Guthrie, theologian (born 1916)
- 9 September
  - Maurice Burton, zoologist (born 1898)
  - Imre König, chess master (born 1901, Austria-Hungary)
- 10 September – Evelyn Wellings, English cricketer (born 1909, Egypt)
- 19 September – Sir Geraint Evans, opera singer (born 1922)
- 28 September
  - William Douglas-Home, tank officer, writer and dramatist, and brother of former prime minister Alec Douglas-Home (born 1912)
  - John Leech, mathematician (born 1926)
- 29 September – Bill Rowe, sound engineer (born 1931)

=== October ===
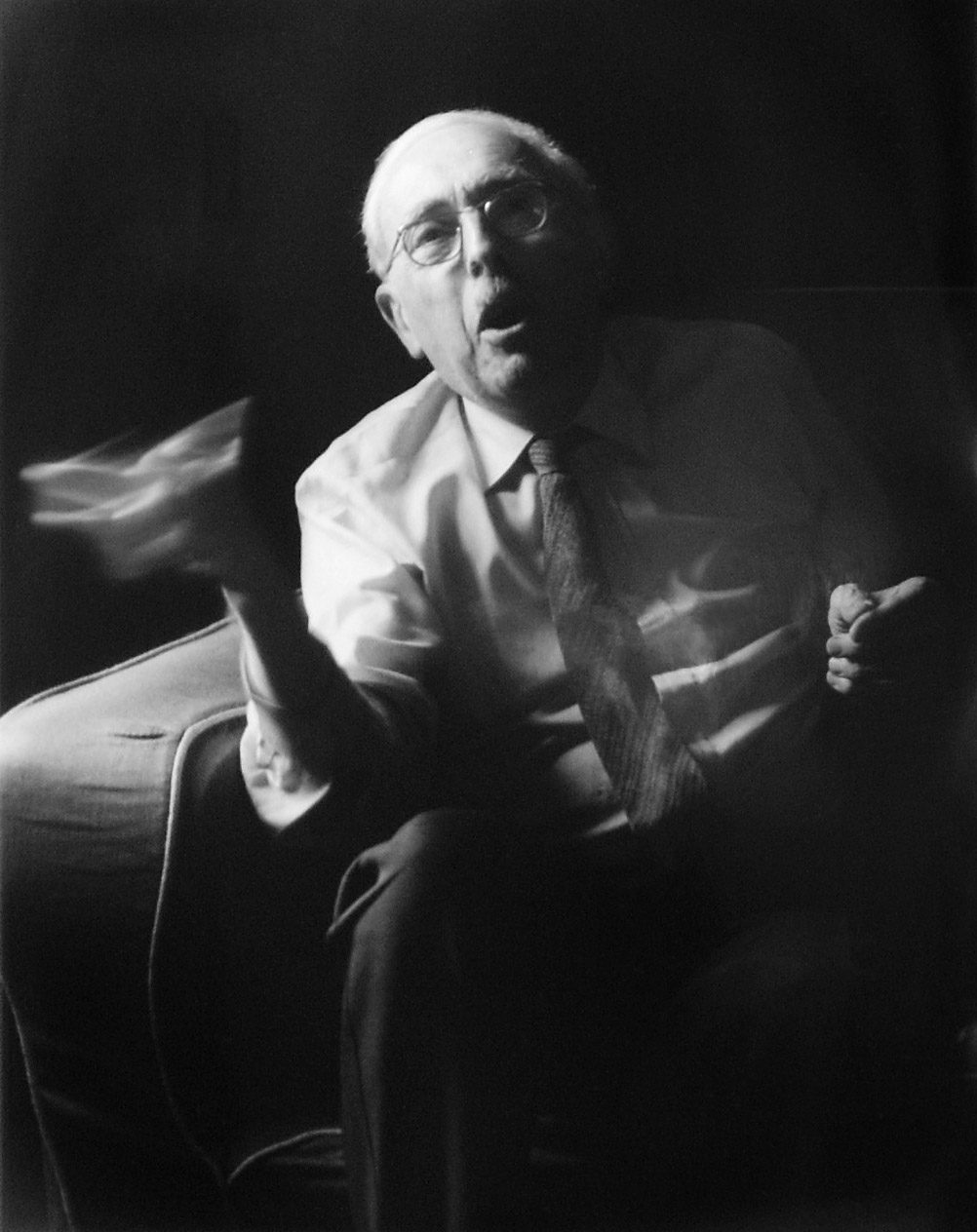
Magnus Pyke

- 3 October – Ken Wilmshurst, triple jumper (born 1931)
- 6 October – Denholm Elliott, actor (born 1922)
- 8 October – Ian Graham Gass, geologist (born 1926)
- 14 October – Willie Waddell, Scottish footballer (born 1921)
- 15 October – Oliver Franks, Baron Franks, public figure (born 1905)
- 18 October – Gerald Ellison, former Bishop of London (born 1910)
- 19 October – Magnus Pyke, scientist and television presenter (born 1908)
- 20 October – Stanley McMaster, Northern Irish politician (born 1926)
- 21 October – Bob Todd, comedy actor (born 1921)
- 22 October
  - Eric Ashby, Baron Ashby, botanist and educator (born 1904)
  - Wilson Humphries, Scottish footballer and football manager (born 1928)
- 27 October – Roy Marshall, cricketer (born 1930, Barbados)
- 29 October – Kenneth MacMillan, ballet dancer and choreographer (born 1929)
- 31 October – Brian MacCabe, athlete (born 1914)

=== November ===
- 3 November
  - Allanah Harper, writer and journalist (born 1904)
  - Haydn Hill, English footballer (born 1913)
- 7 November – Henri Temianka, Scottish-born violinist (born 1906)
- 10 November – John Summerson, architectural historian (born 1904)
- 11 November
  - Giles Bullard, diplomat (born 1926)
  - John Samuel Forrest, physicist (born 1907)
  - Sir Peter Gretton, Royal Navy vice-admiral (born 1912)
- 13 November – Ronnie Bond, drummer (The Troggs) (born 1940)
- 16 November – Phyllis Harding, swimmer (born 1907)
- 25 November
  - Charles Mott-Radclyffe, politician (born 1911)
  - Sir Hugh Wontner, hotelier and Lord Mayor of London (born 1908)
- 26 November
  - Joby Blanshard, actor (born 1919)
  - John Sharp, actor (born 1920)
- 29 November – Paul Ryan, singer-songwriter (born 1948)
- 30 November – Graham Vearncombe, Welsh footballer (born 1934)

=== December ===
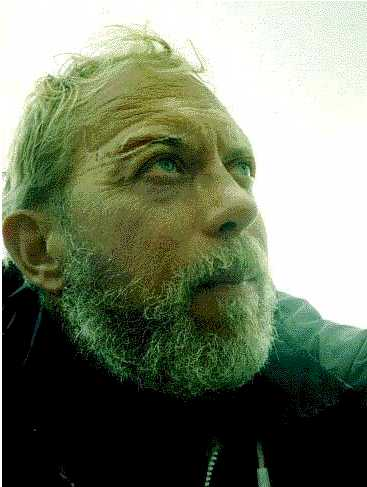
Don Allum

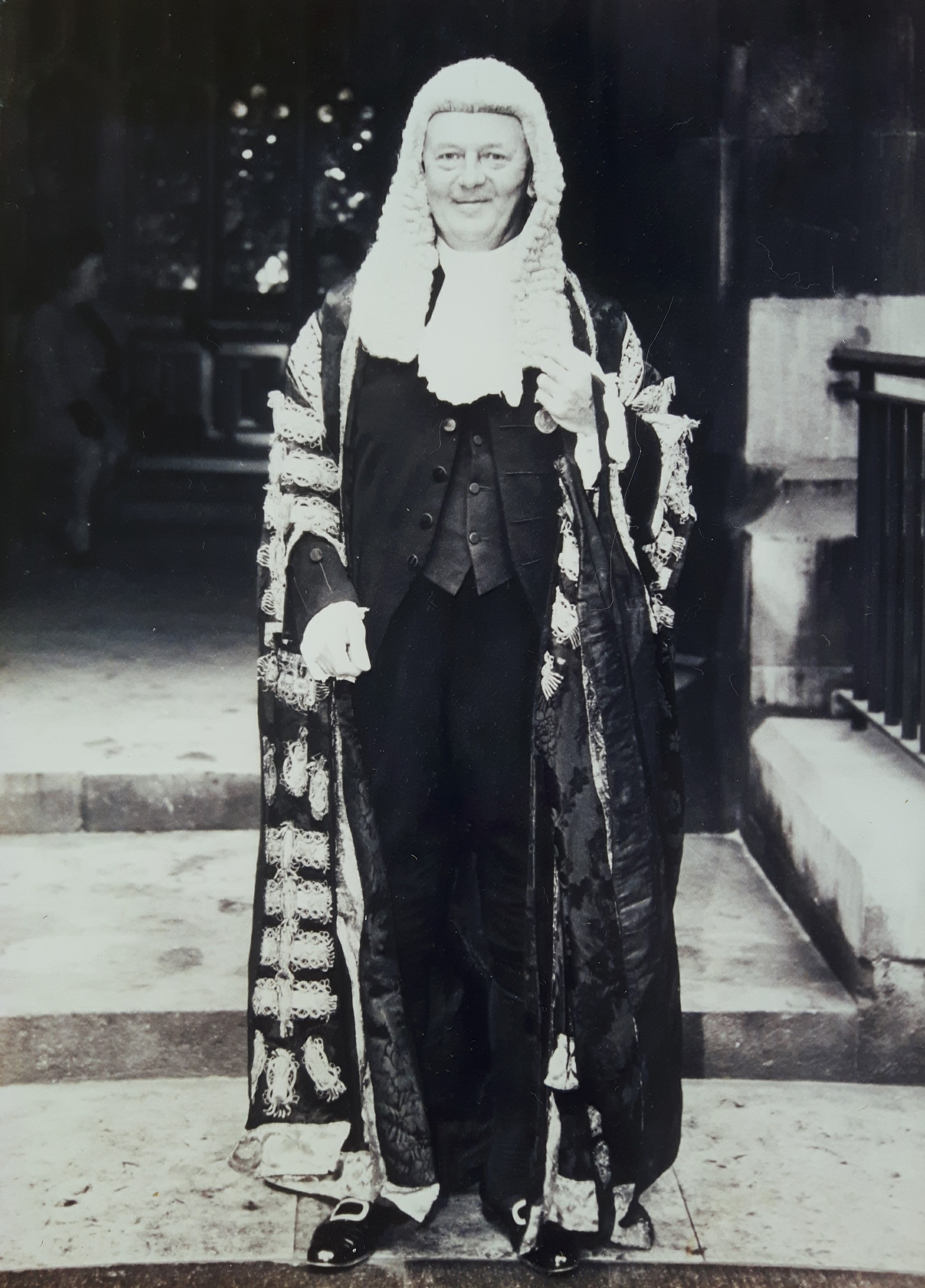
Edmund Davies, Baron Edmund-Davies

- 1 December – Don Allum, oarsman, first person to row across the Atlantic Ocean in both directions (born 1937)
- 2 December
  - Michael Gothard, actor (born 1939); suicide
  - Ralph Izzard, journalist, author and adventurer (born 1910)
- 4 December – Sidney Schofield, politician (born 1911)
- 5 December – Hilary Tindall, actress (born 1938)
- 6 December – Percy Herbert, actor (born 1920)
- 9 December – Thomas Bottomore, Marxist sociologist (born 1920)
- 10 December – Dan Maskell, tennis coach and commentator (born 1908)
- 11 December
  - Ronald Good, botanist (born 1896)
  - Michael Robbins, actor (born 1930)
- 16 December – Erica Brausen, art dealer and founder of the Hanover Gallery (born 1908, German Empire)
- 19 December
  - H. L. A. Hart, legal philosopher (born 1907)
  - Reggie Ingle, English cricketer (born 1903)
- 22 December
  - Milo Sperber, actor, director and writer (born 1911, Poland)
  - Ted Willis, Baron Willis, television dramatist (born 1914)
- 25 December
  - Ted Croker, former Secretary of The Football Association (born 1924)
  - Monica Dickens, author and great-granddaughter of Charles Dickens (born 1915)
  - Sandra Dorne, actress (born 1924)
- 26 December
  - Constance Carpenter, actress (born 1904)
  - Edmund Davies, Baron Edmund-Davies, judge (born 1906)
  - Anthony Huxley, botanist (born 1920)
- 28 December – Cardew Robinson, comic actor (born 1917)
- 31 December
  - Sir Denis Barnett, RAF chief marshal (born 1906)
  - Cyril Peacock, racing cyclist (born 1929)

== See also ==
- 1992 in British music
- 1992 in British television
- List of British films of 1992
