= Richard Hittleman =

American yoga teacher (1927–1991)

- Teaching yoga on his television program Yoga for Health, with Lyn Marshall
- Born: 7 March 1927; New York
- Died: 14 October 1991 (aged 64); Santa Cruz, California
- Occupations: Yoga teacher, television presenter

Richard Hittleman (7 March 1927 – 14 October 1991) was an American yoga teacher and author who taught Hatha and Raja Yoga through one of the first yoga television series, Yoga for Health.

== Early life ==
Richard Lowell Hittleman was born in New York on 7 March 1927, the son of Louis Hittleman, who emigrated from Pinsk, Russia to New York in 1900, and Dora Frances Fillat. Hittleman was a pupil of the Indian spiritual master Ramana Maharshi, along with Paul Brunton, in the late 1940s. He also had an interest in Zen Buddhism, and Buddhism generally. He is said to have been working with his daughter on a re-interpretation of the Tibetan Book of the Dead at the time of his death. His chief teaching was that ultimately all is only divine self (the Hindu atman) and that this was present in all people, to be realized through meditation and other yoga techniques. Hittleman wrote: "'Self' is another word for 'God'. This is the God who is the Absolute, immutable, without qualities, pure Awareness, without beginning or end."

== Career in yoga ==
Richard Hittleman specialized in introducing yoga in an easy-to-follow fashion to those who were new to the subject. Through his books, lectures, recordings and TV programs, he brought yoga to more people than any other person alive at the time. He was most active in the 1960s and 1970s. It has been said that Richard Hittleman introduced yoga to literally millions of people via the medium of television. His method was to start with the most elementary Hatha Yoga postures and gradually bring the student into more advanced physical asanas and the more profound yoga philosophy of Advaita Vedanta. So popular did his Yoga For Health TV programs become that "... the programs were repeated again and again - indeed, in New York 'Yoga for Health' was screened for more than four-and-a-half years without a break".

Hittleman stated his philosophy as follows: "In the yoga scriptures, it is explained that the word "Self" is used to indicate that the Absolute we are attempting to describe is Self-luminous. It shines by its own light that has no beginning and no end. It is dependent upon nothing and is not affected by, nor does it react to, any occurrence in the phenomenal world. It is further characterized as having the qualities of Bliss and Knowledge. That is, when you manifest as that which you truly Are, the experience is one of unqualified Joy and direct (not relative) Knowledge."

He wrote numerous popular books on Hatha Yoga, and several covering Yoga philosophy. He also released a record, Yoga for Life (1961). His style was lucid and readable for newcomers, yet with profound content; he had taken an M.A. in Oriental mysticism at Columbia University and was a friend of Alan Watts.

There were two later series of "Yoga for Health". One was a co production with KTEH, San Jose, starring Hittleman as the instructor and master, with a male model demonstrating intermediate posture and a female model demonstrating beginning postures. The title of the second series was "Yoga and Meditation." the second series was a 1/2 hour shows one for each week or 52 shows. This series covered virtually all types of yoga instructions Bhakti, Hatha, Raja and Karma as well. Each show started with introductions of guests, and instructions of poses. last 1/2 of the show was devoted to lectures on yoga types, foods, and life styles. also several shows had lectures on very many meditation techniques and styles, deep breathing, deep relaxation. He also lectured on "White light healing." These shows were produced by Mort Levit and Gabreal Franklin. A later, and last series, was produced by Mort Levit, and directed by Gabreal Franklin at KMST Studios.

== Death ==
Hittleman died of prostate cancer on 14 October 1991 in Santa Cruz.

== Books ==
- Richard Hittleman's Introduction to Yoga, Bantam Books, August 18, 1997
- Yoga for Health, Ballantine Books, March 12, 1985
- Richard Hittleman's Yoga: 28 Day Exercise Plan, Workman Publishing, 1969 (Bantam, 1983 ISBN 978-0-553-27748-7)
- Guide for the Seeker, Bantam Books, 1978 ISBN 978-0-553-11171-2
- Richard Hittleman's Guide to Yoga Meditation, Bantam Books, 1969
- Yoga Philosophy and Meditation, 1964
- Yoga at Home, 1962
- Yoga: The 8 Steps to Health and Peace
- Yoga for Physical Fitness
- Yoga for Personal Living
- Be Young With Yoga
- Yoga Natural Foods Cookbook
- Richard Hittleman's 30 Day Yoga Meditation Plan
- Weight control through Yoga
- Richard Hittleman's Yoga for Total Fitness
- The Yoga Way to Figure and Facial Beauty
- The Yoga Way
- Yoga U.S.A: The unique exercise system 10 million Americans believe
- Yoga for Special Problems
