= Palawan Press =

Publishing business

Palawan Press Limited was established in London by Simon Draper in 1992, following his retirement as chairman of the Virgin Music Group after its sale to EMI.

As of 2011, Palawan Press publishes exclusive limited edition books costing from £75 to £2000.

== Publications ==
=== Aston Martin ===
- Aston Martin - The Compleat Car
- The Aston Martin DB3S Sportscar
- Aston Martin Zagato
- Aston Martin Ulster.

=== Grand Automobile Marques ===
- Ferrari in Camera
- A Private Car — An account of the Bristol
- The Illustrated Lancia
- Facel Vega - Grand Luxe Sportif
- Gullwing - The Mercedes-Benz 300 SL Coupé
- The Post-War Frazer Nash.
- Bentley Continental Sports Saloon

=== Motoring, motor racing and motor racing photography ===
- Racers — Memoirs of the gentleman drivers
- Klemantaski Himself
- Sixties Motor Racing
- 1946 and All That
- Dick & George
- Drive On! A Social History of the Motor Car.

=== Art ===
- Evermore
- The Atlas of Rare Pheasants Volume I
- The Atlas of Rare Pheasants Volume II

== Collectability ==
A number of editions are considered collector's items. At the Goodwood Revival auction in September 2011, a clothbound edition of Ferrari in Camera sold for £1,063 having originally been available to purchase for £400.
