= Maia Krall Fry =

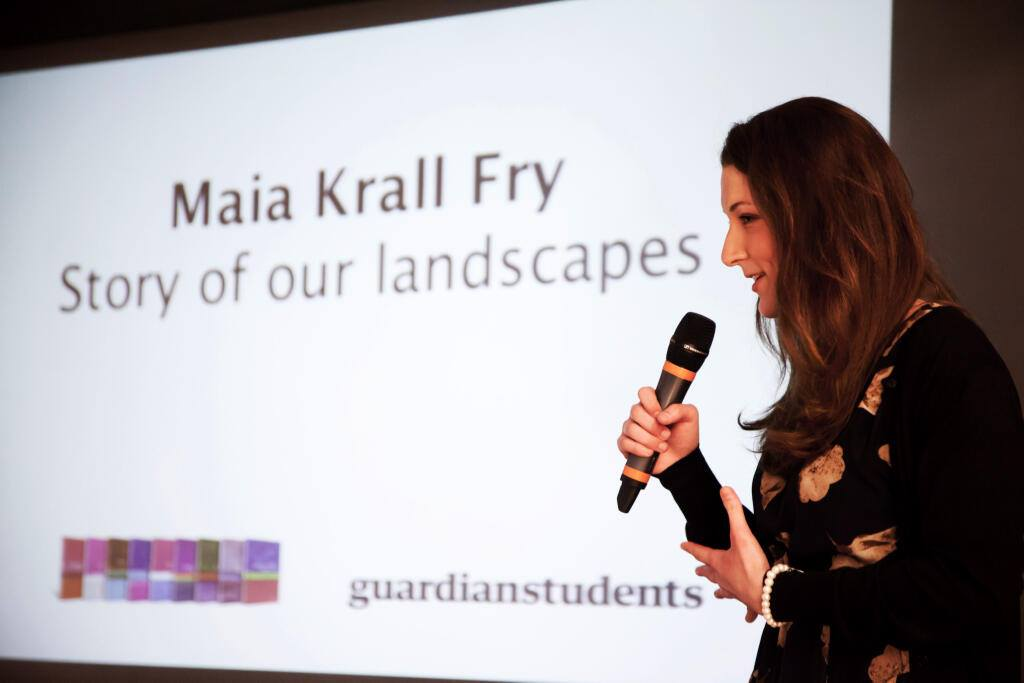
- Born: November 1992 (age 33); London, England
- Occupation: Director/Producer
- Years active: 2011–present

Maia Krall Fry is an English documentary and fiction film director. After gaining recognition for directing the feature film Ebony Road, Maia went on to direct the short film Six Degrees produced by Steel Mill Pictures. Her style focuses heavily on sharing nature, science, and evocative human stories in a poetic and lyrical way.

Films have been screened nationwide at festivals, including multiple times at the BFI, and have been supported by Film 4, the Guardian, Oxford University Press, BBC Scotland, and Stephen Fry. Forthcoming projects include the 2015 web-series Wilder, profiling people who have a strong interaction with nature.

== Career ==
Maia’s most recognized work is the award-winning feature film Ebony Road which was highly commended by industry professionals and won the award for Best Drama at the prestigious 2011 Portobello Film Festival Grand Awards Ceremony. It has since screened at many festivals and venues including at the British Film Institute and Maia here took part in a Q&A at the 5th BFI Future Film Festival on 'How to make your first feature'.

Maia immediately went on to direct the short film Six Degrees on behalf of Steel Mill Pictures and the Hep C Trust. Six Degrees premiered at the 2011 V Festival, won the Choose Life Film Competition, and stars Sam Spruell, Georgia Groome, Sam Spruell, and Laura Aikman & Paul Andrew Williams.

Fiction directing work includes multi award-winning short film Sunder which screened at the BFI London Lesbian & Gay Film Festival and the BFI Imax; the charity single by The Other Guys (University of St Andrews) in aid of Breast Cancer Care which became popular on YouTube; and short film Witches for the Film 4 Scene Stealers competition made the shortlist of the top 30 from the 500 entrants with judges including Anna Higgs, Joe Cornish, Asif Kapadia and Lone Scherfig.

Documentaries include a short which was one of four live finalists in a nationwide film competition run by the Guardian and Oxford University Press after a round of global online voting, and several upcoming independent documentary projects. At the Guardian event, she held a talk titled Story of our Landscapes In 2015, Maia graduated with a First Class degree in Geology from the University of St Andrews where she held a Ted X talk titled How the Earth Shapes Us.

== Filmography ==
Year	Title	Format	Notes
2011	Ebony Road	Feature	Premiered at the Grand Opening of the Portobello Film Festival 2011; WON Best Drama at Portobello Film Festival
2011	Six Degrees	Short	Premiered at the 2011 V Festival WON Choose Life Film Award
2012	Sunder	Short	Screened at 2012 London BFI Lesbian and Gay Film Festival; WON Best Film/Audience Award at BFI Imax Cinematique! Film Festival; WON Best Film at 60 Hour Film Blitz WON Audience Choice Award at 60 Hour Film Blitz
2012	Witches	Short	Nominated as Best Film in the 2012 Film 4 Scene Stealers Competition.
2013	Wolf Bite	Short	WON Best Film at 60 Hour Film Blitz
2015	Wilder	Documentary Series	www.wilderdocs.com

== Awards and nominations ==
Award	Year	Category	Result	Work
Film 4 Scene Stealers Competition	2012	(Director)	Nominated	Witches
BFI Imax Cinematique Film Festival	2012	Best Film/Audience Award (Director)	Won	Sunder
60 Hour Film Festival	2012	Best Film (Director)	Won	Sunder
60 Hour Film Festival	2012	Audience Choice Award (Director)	Won	Sunder
Portobello Film Festival Grand Awards Ceremony	2011	Best Drama (Director)	Won	Ebony Road
Choose Life Film Competition	2011	(Director)	Won	Six Degrees
