= Theo Cowan =

British actor

Theo Cowan (born Bristol, England) is a British actor. He graduated from Guildhall School of Music and Drama in 2014. After graduation, Theo has performed in various television and theatre productions including Primetime at The Royal Court Theatre, Headlong (theatre company)'s production of The Absence of War directed by Jeremy Herrin, Lucy Bailey's Comus at Shakespeare's Globe and more recently the Richard Bean and Oliver Chris comedy Jack Absolute Flies Again at the National Theatre. Theo also played the role of Fred Johnson in the BBC adaptation of The Outcast written and adapted for screen by Sadie Jones.

Before training Theo appeared in theatre shows including two plays at the Bristol Old Vic, the role of Henry in Lord of the Flies at Open Air Theatre, Regent's Park and on screen as the recurring character Steven O'Connell in the BBC series Doctors.
