= Haydn Hill =

English footballer

Personal information
- Full name: Haydn Henry Clifford Hill
- Date of birth: 4 July 1913
- Place of birth: Creswell, Derbyshire, England
- Date of death: 3 November 1992 (aged 79)
- Place of death: Weymouth, Dorset, England
- Position: Goalkeeper

Senior career*
Years	Team	Apps	(Gls)
1934–1935	Corinthian		
1935	Sheffield Wednesday	4	(0)
1935–1936	Yorkshire Amateur		
1937–1940	Dulwich Hamlet		

International career
1936	Great Britain	2	(0)
1935–1938	England Amateurs	8	(0)
- * Club domestic league appearances and goals

Haydn Henry Clifford Hill (4 July 1913 – 3 November 1992) was an English amateur footballer who represented Great Britain at the 1936 Summer Olympics. He played as a goalkeeper for Corinthian, Sheffield Wednesday, Yorkshire Amateur and Dulwich Hamlet. He also played cricket for Dorset.

== Football ==
Hill played for Corinthian a number of times in 1934 and 1935. He played for Yorkshire Amateur in 1935 and 1936.

Hill played for the England national amateur football team 8 times between 1935 and 1938. He made his debut against Wales on 19 January 1935 and played for the last time on 12 March 1938 against Scotland.

Hill made 4 appearances for Sheffield Wednesday in 1935. He played twice in the 1934–35 Football League and twice in 1935–36.

Hill played for Dulwich Hamlet from 1937 to 1940. In his first season, he was in the team that beat Leyton 2–0 in the FA Amateur Cup final at Upton Park on 3 April 1937. At the end of the game he "was carried shoulder high off the field, and the tribute was well deserved."

== Cricket ==
Hill played cricket for Dorset, making 24 appearances in the Minor Counties Cricket Championship between 1948 and 1953.
