= Lyn Marshall =

British yoga teacher (1944–1992)

- Seated in Muktasana, a yoga pose
- Born: 8 May 1944; London, England
- Died: 4 May 1992 (aged 47); Edenhall, Cumbria, England
- Known for: Books and television programmes on yoga

Lyn Marshall (8 May 1944 – 4 May 1992), was a British yoga teacher, broadcaster, writer, model, ballerina, and actress. She was one of the first presenters of British yoga television programmes in the 1970s and 1980s, with Wake up with Yoga and Keep up with Yoga on ITV's London Weekend Television and Everyday Yoga on the BBC. She wrote books that accompanied each series.

Marshall died of brain cancer on 4 May 1992, at age 47.

== Filmography ==
=== Television ===
- Yoga for Health with Richard Hittleman
- Wake up with Yoga (London Weekend Television (LWT)) (1976)
- Keep up with Yoga (LWT) (1976)
- Celebrity Squares (Associated Television (ATV) (18 December 1976)
- Everyday Yoga (BBC One) (1983)
- Instant Stress Cure (1988)

=== Film ===
- Up Pompeii (1971)

== Bibliography ==
- Wake Up to Yoga ISBN 978-0706350777 (1975)
- Keep Up with Yoga ISBN 978-0706352368
- Yoga for Your Children ISBN 978-0706357783
- Everyday Yoga ISBN 978-0563165569
- Instant Stress Cure: Immediate Relief from Everyday Stress Problems ISBN 978-0091771201
- Yogacise ISBN 978-0563362791

== Discography ==
- Lyn Marshall's Yoga (1975)
- Lyn Marshall's Yoga vol.2 (1975)
- Lyn Marshall's Everyday Yoga (1983)

=== As featured artist ===
- Parasympathetic (from Neon Savage EP) Fil OK (2013)
