= Don Allum =

Donald Edward Allum
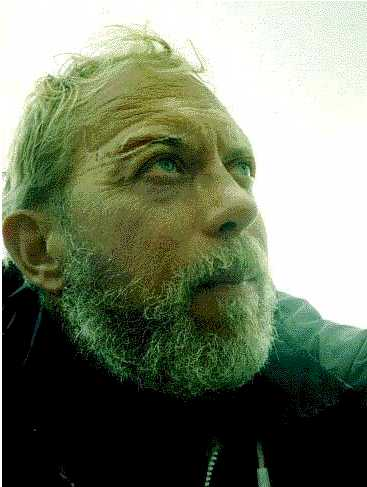
- Born: 17 May 1937
- Died: 1 December 1992 (aged 55); Heston, Middlesex
- Occupation: Oarsman
- Known for: First person to row across the Atlantic Ocean in both directions

Donald Edward Allum (17 May 1937 – 1 December 1992) was a British oarsman, the first person to row across the Atlantic Ocean in both directions.

== Duo Atlantic rowing ==
Allum's cousin, Geoff Allum, initially thought of the idea to row solo across the Atlantic after reading John Ridgway and Chay Blyth's book A Fighting Chance and The Penance Way by Merton Naydler, written about the respective exploits of rowing duos Ridgway and Blyth, and David Johnston and John Hoare. However, on hearing the news that this feat had just been completed by John Fairfax, Geoff instead decided that he and Don should attempt to become the first crew to row the Atlantic in both directions.

In 1971 the pair made their westbound attempt in their boat, the dory QE3. During the crossing, Don and Geoff had only a short wave radio receiver for listening to the BBC World Service; no electronic equipment for communicating with other vessels. For navigation, they used a sextant. Their chosen port of departure was Las Palmas on Gran Canaria, in the Canary Islands; in part because it had also been Ridgway and Blyth's starting point, as well as that of Alain Bombard, who rafted across the Atlantic in 1952. After initially making good time, they became much slower for the second half of the trip due to a number of issues encountered. Having packed enough drinking water to allow one-half imperial gallon (2.3 L) per man per day for 100 days, the pair later discovered that due to poor re-ballasting after use, the bags had moved around too much in the bilges and around a quarter of their total water stocks were lost from bags snagging on sharp parts of the boat. Added to the fact that their entire food stocks were dried food which required re-hydration, they drastically reduced their daily intake of both food and water, losing strength and weight as the days and weeks went by. On 26 March 1971, after 73 days at sea, Don and Geoff Allum rowed into Harrison Point in Barbados. When they landed, only three imperial gallons (14 L) of drinking water remained.

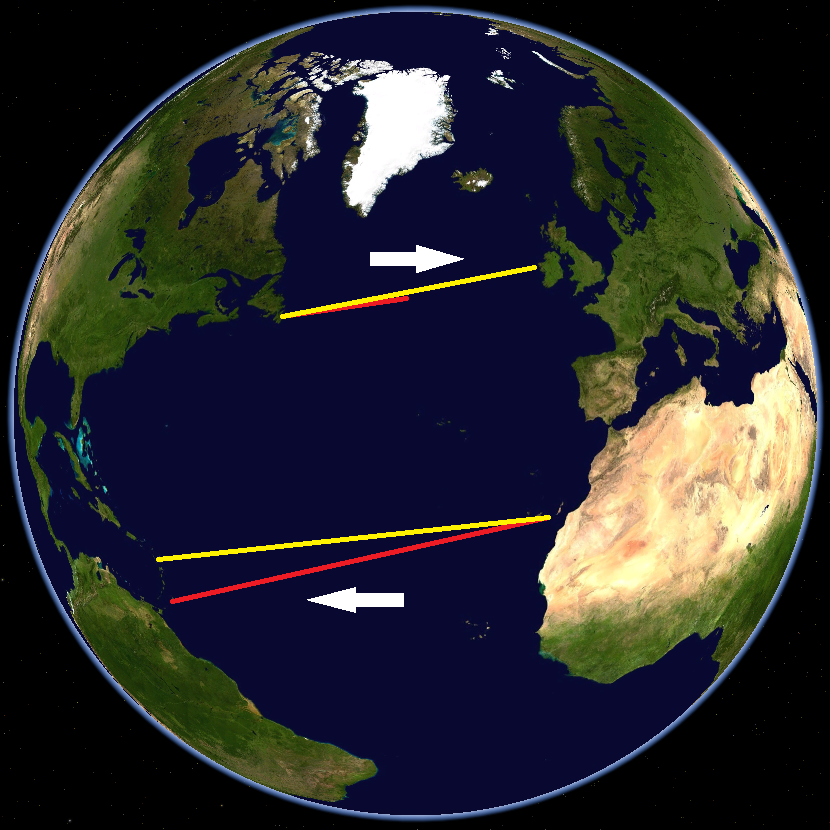
Don Allum's routes across the Atlantic in the 1970s with Geoff Allum (red) and solo in the 1980s (yellow).

Don and Geoff Allum began their eastward attempt from St John's, Newfoundland in June 1972, heading towards the west coast of Ireland. After only three days, Geoff had to be picked up by a passing oil tanker as he was suffering from hypothermia and severe seasickness. Don continued on for 76 days, on 36 of which he met with head winds which pushed him back towards Newfoundland. On the evening of day 75, the boat was swamped by a large wave, and Allum lost his oars, spare clothes and most of his food. Luckily, he was picked up the following day by a passing ship. After the failed attempt, Geoff decided not to try again, and Don waited 14 years before making another Atlantic rowing attempt.

== Solo Atlantic rowing ==
In 1986 at the age of 49, Allum revisited the westward crossing as a solo endeavour. He successfully rowed from Pasito Blanco on Gran Canaria to the Caribbean island of Nevis in 114 days; however, due to completely depleting his water stocks in the final two weeks, by the time he reached his destination he had lost half of his body weight and his eyesight and hearing were failing. This experience reportedly had a long-term effect on his health and led to multiple kidney failures within the following years.

In September 1987 Allum completed his eastward crossing of the Atlantic, from St John's, Newfoundland to Dooagh on Achill Island, County Mayo, Ireland. The journey took 77 days and very nearly ended in disaster.

== Death and legacy ==
Allum's health declined during the following years, and multiple kidney failures were attributed by Geoff Allum to Allum's rowing experiences – in particular his 1986 westward Atlantic crossing. Allum reportedly refused to seek medical treatment during this time. He died from a heart attack in Heston, Middlesex, on 2 November 1992 (also reported as 1 December 1992), at the age of 55.

A monument was erected in Dooagh on Achill Island, County Mayo, Ireland, to commemorate Allum's 1987 landing.

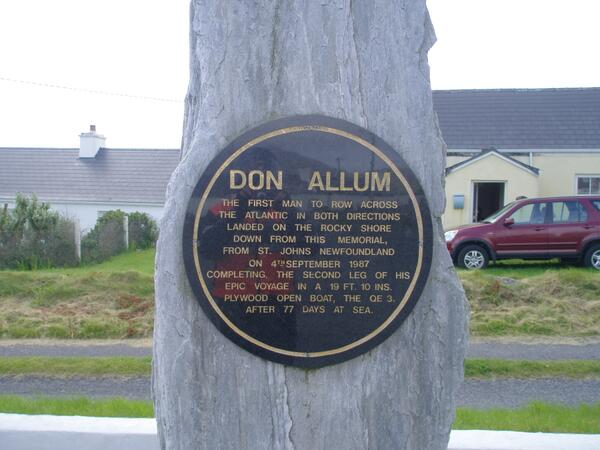
Monument erected in Dooagh on Achill Island, County Mayo, Ireland

British rock band Marillion released an eighteen-minute song called "Ocean Cloud" on their 2004 album Marbles based on his solo crossings.
