= Frank Vigar =

English cricketer (1917–2004)

Personal information
- Full name: Frank Henry Vigar
- Born: 14 July 1917; Bruton, Somerset, England
- Died: 31 May 2004 (aged 86)
- Batting: Right-handed
- Bowling: Legbreak

Domestic team information
- Years: Team
- 1938–1954: Essex
- FC debut: 28 May 1938 Essex v Glamorgan
- Last FC: 28 August 1954 Essex v Sussex

Career statistics
Competition	First-class
Matches	257
Runs scored	8,858
Batting average	26.28
100s/50s	12/39
Top score	145
Balls bowled	15,398
Wickets	241
Bowling average	37.90
5 wickets in innings	8
10 wickets in match	0
Best bowling	8/128
Catches/stumpings	197/–
- Source: CricketArchive, 22 September 2009

Frank Henry Vigar (14 July 1917 – 31 May 2004) was an English cricketer who played first-class cricket for Essex County Cricket Club between 1938 and 1954. A right-handed batsman, and leg break bowler, Vigar served as an all-rounder with 8,858 runs at 26.28 and 241 wickets at 37.90. From his rained-off debut in 1938, Vigar went on to play 257 matches for his county. His greatest success came in the "golden summer" of 1947, where he scored 1,735 runs and took 64 wickets. A partnership with Peter Smith of 218 for the final wicket remains an Essex record.

He spent the Second World War serving in the Royal Air Force. As his career progressed, his once useful bowling became both less successful and subordinate to Smith's, though he remained a sound and reliable batsman until a decline in form prompted the end of his playing career in 1954. He made minor county and invitation appearances on occasion up to 1965, and spent three years coaching West of Scotland before retiring.

== Career ==
=== Early days ===
Vigar was born on 14 July 1917 in Bruton, Somerset. An "ungainly" batsman, Vigar developed into a "determined middle order" player, though he would never been known as a "hitter." Trevor Bailey recalled him to be "a very unusual mix – a very sound batsman, solid and stubborn, and a useful leg-spinner," while Wisden described him as "a tall, Somerset-born leg-spinner who turned into one of Essex's most reliable batsmen in the decade after the war," and "tweaked a few." Vigar began his cricketing career as a young amateur, playing for the Essex's Young Amateur team against a similar development squad for Surrey in early September 1935. Vigar scored 30 and took three wickets.

Vigar's first match, on 28 May, was rained off after Glamorgan had been dismissed for 100 runs on the first day, and Vigar did not bat or bowl. By 1 June, however, he was contributing to Essex's efforts. That day, Essex faced Worcestershire and was bowled for a duck by Peter Jackson before making 24 not out in the second innings. Worcestershire took the full 12 points following a 60 run victory. He played four more matches that season, amassing a total of 50 runs at 8.33, and taking four wickets at 58.75, including a career-best 2/39 against Derbyshire on 25 August.

=== Regular appearances ===
Vigar became a more regular fixture in the 1939 season, where, from June onwards, he began opening the batting on occasion. Playing in 14 County Championship matches, his return of 282 runs at 20.21 including a maiden century, 121 against Gloucestershire on 8 July. Vigar had originally been promoted up the order as a nightwatchman, however he survived to score his century the next day after the player he had been intended to protect, Jack O'Connor, had been dismissed for a duck. Vigar also took eight wickets during the season at 22.62, composed largely from a 4/20 against Cambridge University on 24 June to take Essex to an innings victory. His other contributions were limited during the season, with single figure scores and only small numbers of overs being bowled, nevertheless Essex reached 4th in the County Championship that year.

=== World War II ===
Vigar's first-class career was then put on hold by the Second World War. Between 26 August 1939 and 11 May 1946 he did not make an appearance for Essex. He did, however, serve in the Royal Air Force, and played several matches for armed services teams between 1941 and 1945, as well as a handful of other matches between the South and the North, and various Essex Second XI outings. The first of these matches, on 12 July 1941, saw Vigar playing for his home county of Somerset's Service team, facing Gloucestershire's Services team in Clifton. Batting at six, he made 49, and then bowled four wicketless overs for 43 and took one catch. The two teams met again on 2 August at Taunton Cricket Ground, where Vigar made one run and did not bowl. One final match on 6 September, where Vigar played for the North against the South, saw him score eight and then take two wickets to take his team to a four wicket victory.

Two more matches came during the war years. A British Empire XI faced a choice Essex XI selected by Ray Smith on 22 August 1942, in which there was a place for Vigar. Smith's 12-wicket performance in the match outshone Vigar, who scored four runs and bowled four wicket-less overs. Vigar then played for the West against Glamorgan at Cardiff Arms Park on 18 August 1945, where he scored 37 and two wickets.

=== Breakthrough years ===
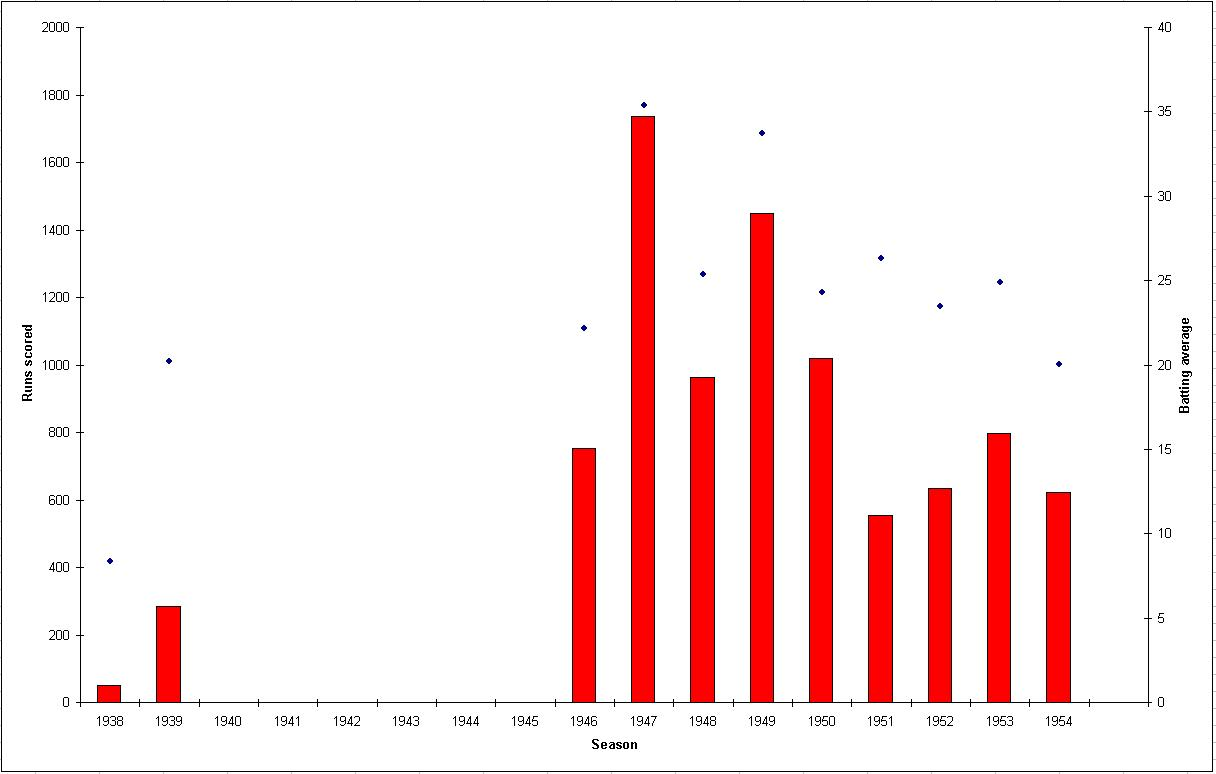
Graph showing Vigar's runs per season (red bars) and batting averages (blue). Note his most prolific years, 1946–1947, as well as the decline during the mid-1950s, and the absent years of the Second World War.

On 11 May 1946, Vigar returned to county cricket with a County Championship match against Somerset. The next two seasons would be Vigar's breakthrough years. He scored 753 runs at 22.14 in 1946, with a century and three half-centuries, and took 51 wickets at 28.03. His season began strongly, with his three half-centuries on the trot, and then the second century of his career – 101 in the second innings against Northamptonshire on 1 June. In strong form, Vigar then took five-wickets against Yorkshire on 10 July, and then six for 78 against Hampshire on 20 July. He followed this with 8/128 on 10 August against Leicestershire, the 80th best performance by an Essex bowler, beating his previous best of 6/78 by some margin and reaching a landmark of 50 first-class wickets, though he was unable to prevent a draw. Two matches later, on 20 August, he took 8/169 also against Leicestershire.

In 1947 Vigar returned a career best 1,735 runs at 35.40, with five centuries and eight half-centuries, and took 64 wickets at 43.48. His run total for 1947 placed him 26th across the country. He began his season on 3 May, with a match against Surrey which had low returns of 23 and one, and no wickets, followed by a knock of 84 against Cambridge University. He was also picking up two to three wickets a match. On 31 May, against Nottinghamshire, he scored 111 and 27 – passing 1,500 first-class runs in the process. A knock of 112 followed on 5 July, against Warwickshire, and two matches later Vigar took 5/68 against Gloucestershire.

Vigar reached 100 first-class wickets in the next match with 2/73 against Glamorgan on 16 July, and scored 125 against Hampshire on 23 July. A wicket against Worcestershire on 2 August gave him 50 for the season, and a score of 114 came in the next match against Derbyshire. This five-hour knock, along with Peter Smith's 163, compiled a 218-last-wicket partnership which remains an Essex record. Vigar then took 4/75 and scored 84 against Yorkshire on 27 August, and then ended his season in a combined-team match of Surrey and Kent versus Middlesex and Essex on 6 September – where he scored 145 and 53, and took five wickets in the match. 145 would remain his career best with the bat.

=== 1948–1951 ===
Graph showing Vigar's wickets per season (purple bars) and bowling averages (blue). Note his most prolific years, 1946-1947 – the only occasions where his bowling average was lower than the number of wickets he took – as well as the decline during the mid-1950s, and the absent years of the Second World War.

Vigar's batting was not bringing consistent returns, and he narrowly missed out on 1,000 runs in the 1948 season, ending with 964 at 25.36, supported by 27 wickets at 41.48. after a knock of 48 and a four-wicket haul against Glamorgan during the opening match of the season on 8 May against Glamorgan, he faced the touring Australian team – so successful in recent times that it had earned the sobriquet The Invincibles. Vigar and his Essex teammates faced the Australians in Southend-on-Sea on 15 May. Vigar collected two wickets for 66 runs during the Australians only innings, however one over bowled before lunch has subsequently entered Essex Club folklore. Vigar, in "an attempt to lure Don Bradman into a rash stroke" was brought on to bowl. The first of his "barely turning" deliveries "fizzed straight through and Bradman, who was on strike, calmly patted it back," Vigar was heard to say "I've got this fella's measure." He was then, however, hit to the boundary between square-leg and mid-wicket five times by Bradman, who was eventually dismissed by Peter Smith for 187. Australia, reaching 721 thanks to further centuries from Ron Saggers, Bill Brown and Sam Loxton. Vigar picked up a pair – two scores of zero – being dismissed first ball in the first innings and second ball in the second innings, as Essex stumbled to an innings defeat.

Vigar resumed his career in the County Championship later that month, meeting Nottinghamshire on 19 May. He scored 37 in the first innings, however failed to take a wicket. More often as his career progressed from the successes of 1946 and 1947, he bowling would become less effective, and less used. Nevertheless, on 5 June against Surrey, he returned 3/127 and 3/40 with the ball. In his next match against Gloucestershire on 9 June, he scored 103 and took four wickets in the match. On 30 June, he dismissed Vic Wilson to pass 150 first-class wickets however it was his only wicket of the match. On 21 July he made 94 against Derbyshire, though he only bowled six overs, and on 7 August he made 70 and 32 to pass 3,500 first-class runs. He narrowly missed out on a second century for the season when he was stumped on 99 against Somerset on 14 August, and ended the season with five wicket-less overs and scores of three and 41 against Northamptonshire on 28 August. Essex came 13th in the County Championship that season, and Vigar continued to struggle with his bowling. From bowling 4,611 deliveries for 2,783 runs in 1947, at 3.6 an over, he bowled only 1,827 balls in 1948, and would never bowl more than 1,763 balls in a season for the remainder of his career, and his bowling average over a season would drop below 37.00 only once more. His bowling was slowly being surpassed by Smith, who consistently recorded better returns, and thus Vigar "rarely got the most helpful end."

His batting, however, continued to flourish, and he scored 1,000 runs in consecutive seasons across 1949 and 1950. The 1949 season saw 1,449 runs at 33.69, with three centuries and seven half centuries. His bowling returned 28 wickets at 32.46, including one five-wicket-haul. Vigar's season opened with a fixture against the Marylebone Cricket Club on 30 April, where he took one wicket and scored three and one. He made 63 against Middlesex on 14 May, and 136 against Kent on 18 May – passing 4,000 first-class runs when he reached 53. For the next two first-class matches he was not called upon to bowl at all, though against Somerset on 18 June he scored his second century of the season, 119 while batting at number three, to take Essex to a ten-wicket victory. Once again, he was not asked to bowl. He followed this up on 6 July with another hundred, 114 against Leicestershire and 63* in the second innings, to pass 4,500 first-class runs.

Vigar then took 3/90 against Northamptonshire on 16 July, and scored 86* against Nottingham, passing 1,000 for the season on 20 July. On 10 August, Essex met a touring New Zealand side, Vigar found success: taking 2/49 and 3/41, as well as scoring 89 and 46 in a drawn match. He also made 87 in the next match, against Sussex, and took three wickets. Vigar then met Somerset on 20 August. He made 24 in Essex's first innings, and then proceeded to take 7/102. Though he could not prevent an innings defeat for Essex, these were his best bowling figures of the season, and second best of his career. Other than a half-century against Lancashire on 24 August, however, he made but single figure scores for the remaining three matches of the season, ending with a fixture against Hampshire where he made two and bowled eight wicket-less overs for 41 runs.

Essex began the 1950 County Championship with a ten-wicket defeat against Northamptonshire on 10 May. Vigar scored 65 and 34, though failed to take a wicket. He would go on to make 1,020 runs for the season from his 27 appearances, the second consecutive time he would pass 1,000 runs in a calendar year – the third time in his career overall and also the last. His bowling continued to decline, however: his 1,763 deliveries were the most he would bowl in a season, and his 21 wickets was the best return he would have, for the remainder of his career. Vigar made 86 in the next match on 13 May against Glamorgan, though he only bowled eight overs. Against Surrey on 20 May, though he only scored 13 and 16, they took him passed 5,500 first-class runs, and he took 3/71 and scored 46* against Nottinghamshire on 7 June. His bowling was now being consistently outperformed by Peter Smith's, who since 1947 had enjoyed seasonal wicket returns of 172, 92, 82 and 127 wickets – each higher than Vigar's career best returns. Nevertheless, Vigar took 5/57 to Smith's 4/96 against Sussex on 10 June, and scored 144 against Northamptonshire on 17 June. In the next match, on 21 June against Yorkshire, he took his 200th first-class wicket, Len Hutton, for 156.

Vigar then top-scored in an innings of 60 as Essex were dismissed for 158 by Somerset on 28 June, and another half-century of 56 against the same opposition on 5 July took him past 6,000 first-class runs. On 23 August, following a string of low scores and wicketless overs, Vigar and his county faced a touring West Indies side at home. Managing only one in the first innings, he took a catch to dismiss Everton Weekes for 23 but was not called onto bowl. He made 11 in the second innings but could not prevent the tourists from winning by seven wickets. The final County Championship match for Essex quickly followed on 30 August. Vigar made 25, passing 1,000 runs for the season on the only day where play was possible. Essex, however, finished bottom of the Championship table.

Essex began the 1951 season with a match against Cambridge University where Vigar scored a duck and did not bowl. He opened his account for the season with 10* and six, and one wicket against the MCC on 9 May. He would go on to score only 553 runs from his 23 matches with a best of 58 however, at an average of 26.33 inflated by eight not outs. He also bowled the fewest deliveries in the season since 1939, taking only eight wickets at 38.75. Against Glamorgan on 16 May he made the first of his three half-centuries for the season, 54*, but again went wicketless while his counterpart Smith took eight wickets. His season-best 58 came on 30 June against Leicestershire, taking him past 6,500 first-class runs, and this was followed two matches later by a knock of 52* against Lancashire on 7 July. He scored 46 and collected three wickets against Sussex on 1 August, took three wickets against Surrey on 8 August, however the remainder of his season was fairly unproductive. He was again outperformed by Smith, who took 87 wickets at 27.74, as Essex reached 8th in the County Championship.

As the 1951 season progressed, Vigar also became involved with the Ilford cricket school, the first of its kind in Essex. Along with Trevor Bailey, Sonny Avery and Bill Morris, Vigar assisted Harold Faragher in its development.

=== Final seasons ===
Vigar featured in 31 matches in the 1952 season, the most of his career, and scored 634 runs at 23.48. He made only two centuries, the fewest since 1939, and his average was inflated by 17 not outs, also the most of his career. His bowling also continued to struggle – 19 wickets at 37.63. 1952, however, was also the final season for his rival bowler Peter Smith, who only managed two wickets in one match. Vigar opened his season against Cambridge University, making 41* and bowling 11 unsuccessful overs. On 15 May, he faced TN Pearce's XI – a team that included Smith – and scored 28 and 33. He took 4/90 and 4/69 against Surrey on 21 May; took one wicket during a match against a touring Indian side; and scored 63* and took 2/40 against Leicestershire on 7 June – passing 7,000 first-class runs in the process. A series of low scores followed, until 20 August where he took 2/18 against Middlesex. On the final match of the season, Essex faced Yorkshire on 29 August. Vigar made 10* in the first innings, and 58 in the second as Essex followed on, however this could not prevent Yorkshire taking a ten-wicket win.

Vigar struggled further in the 1953 season – taking only four wickets at 55.75, his worst career figures since 1938. His batting was an improvement on the previous season, however, scoring 796 runs at 24.87 from 26 matches, including four half-centuries. He faced Hampshire on 2 May, scoring two and 19* but not being asked to bowl, followed by 37* and 12*. He then made 47 against Middlesex on 16 May, and again on 30 May against Sussex, however he followed this with a pair on 3 June. Opening the batting on 27 June against Kent, he made 77, and took 3/56. He followed this with 52 against Kent at Blackheath on 4 July, and 64 against Leicestershire on 17 July. On 1 August, he faced Worcestershire, and his knock of 15 took him passed 8,000 first-class runs. Against the touring Australian side in the lead up to the 1953 Ashes series, the tourists took victory by an innings and 212 runs, as Essex were routed for 129 and 136 in the face of the oppositions' 477/7 declared. Vigar managed only two in each innings and did not bowl. Vigar regained some form with a score of 42 against Leicestershire on 19 August, then 50 and 39 against Gloucestershire on 26 August. In the final match of the season, against Warwickshire, he managed 19 and 22. Essex came 12th in the County Championship.

1954 was Vigar's final season, and he played 22 matches. He scored 621 runs at 20.03, with three half-centuries, and took seven wickets at 44.14. Opening the season with a match against Cambridge University, he made 15 and 37, and following a series of low scores made 60 against Kent on 26 May, as well as taking a wicket. On 29 May, he took 2/24 against Sussex, and then scored 23 and nine against Warwickshire on 2 June to pass 8,500. On 30 June, he played against Cambridgeshire for the Essex Second XI, scoring one and four not out, and taking two wickets. He then took 6/55 and scored 22 against Norfolk, and then scored four and took four wickets for one run against Cambridgeshire one more. On 16 July, he faced Suffolk and scored 53 opening the batting, took two wickets then scored 21*.

On 24 July, he made 52 and took one wicket against Glamorgan, and then on 31 July he scored 65 against Worcestershire. Canada then touring England, and faced Essex at Clacton-on-Sea on 4 August. Vigar made only five before he hit his own wicket, and did not bat again nor bowl. Pakistan also toured England that month, though Vigar only contributed one run. On 28 August, Vigar played his final first-class match against Sussex at the County Ground, Hove. Batting at three, he scored 12 and one as the match was drawn. Essex came 15th in the Championship, having won only three matches, and with his form declining, Vigar was released from his county.

=== Coaching ===
Following his playing career, Vigar travelled to Scotland to coach West of Scotland Cricket Club for three years. The club won the West League Cup in 1957 and the Western Cup in 1959. On 5 August 1965, Vigar returned to cricket for an invitation XI of the Mayor of Redbridge. He scored 11 and took 3/47 to lead his team to victory by 42 runs. Following his retirement, Vigar moved to Hampshire. He died on 31 May 2004, aged 86.
