= James Burns (cricketer) =

English cricketer (1866–1957)

Personal information
- Born: 20 June 1866; Liverpool, Lancashire, England
- Died: 11 September 1957 (aged 91); Hampstead, London, England
- Batting: Right-handed

Domestic team information
- Years: Team
- 1890–1896: Essex

Career statistics
Competition	FC
Matches	41
Runs scored	1134
Batting average	17.18
100s/50s	1/4
Top score	114
Balls bowled	894
Wickets	15
Bowling average	30.66
5 wickets in innings	1
10 wickets in match	0
Best bowling	6/41
Catches/stumpings	15/0
- Source: Cricinfo, 27 July 2013

James Burns (20 June 1866 – 11 September 1957) was an English cricketer. He played for Essex between 1890 and 1896 as a right-handed middle order batter and as an occasional left-arm slow bowler, and for Marylebone Cricket Club in occasional matches up to 1901. He was also a football player who played for West Bromwich Albion and Notts County.

Burns and George Higgins both scored centuries in Essex's first-ever County Championship fixture, the match against Warwickshire at Edgbaston in May 1895; Burns scored 114 and Higgins 118, and together they put on 205 for the fourth wicket. Neither scored any further centuries in first-class cricket.
