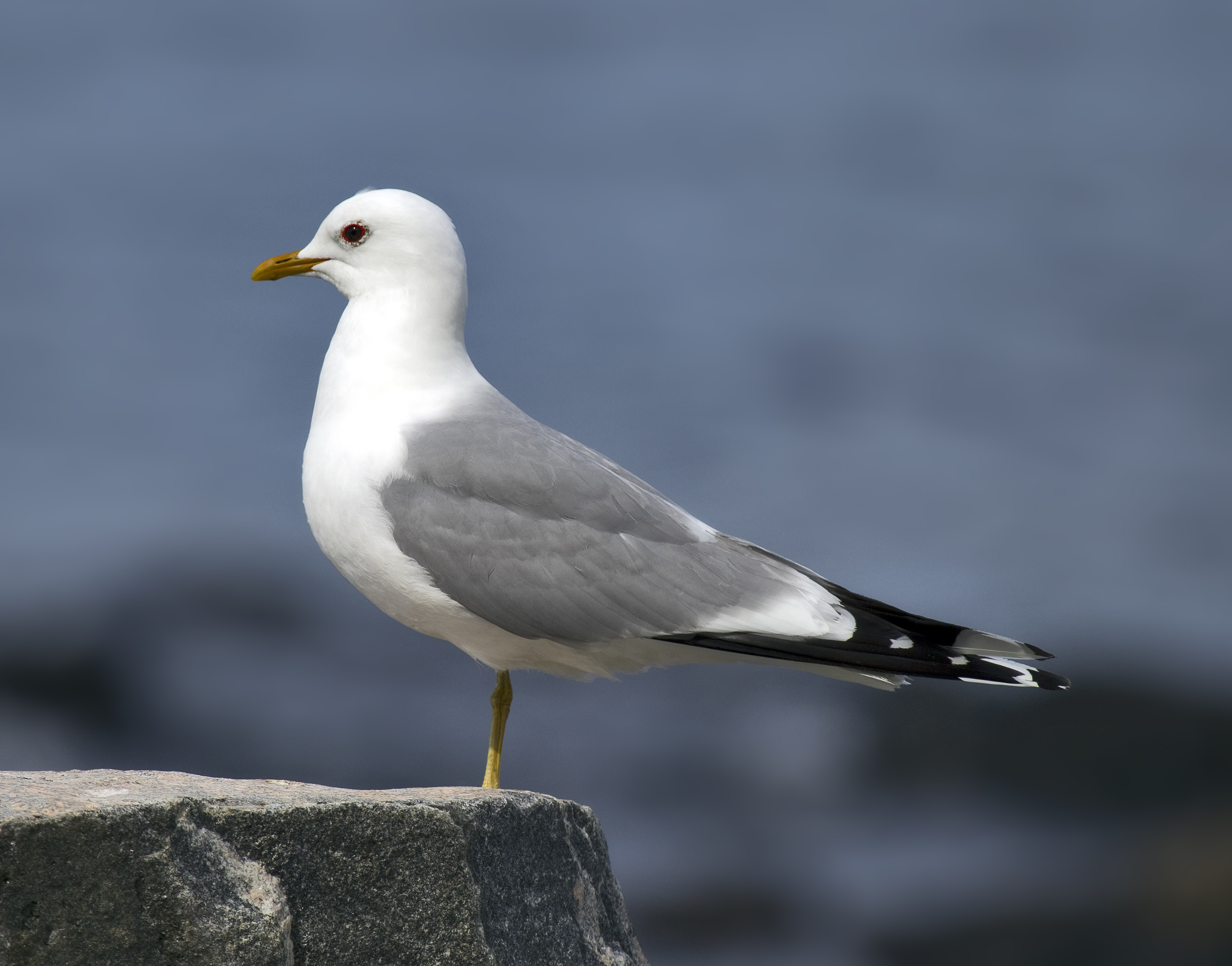
- Adult in breeding plumage, Norway

Conservation status
- Least Concern (IUCN 3.1)

Scientific classification
- Kingdom: Animalia
- Phylum: Chordata
- Class: Aves
- Order: Charadriiformes
- Family: Laridae
- Genus: Larus
- Species: L. canus

Binomial name
- Larus canus Linnaeus, 1758

= Common gull =

Species of bird

The common gull (Larus canus) is a medium-sized gull that breeds in cool temperate regions of the Palearctic from Iceland and Scotland east to Kamchatka in the Russian Far East. Most common gulls migrate further south in winter, reaching the Mediterranean Sea, the southern Caspian Sea, and the seas around China and Japan; northwest European populations are at least partly resident. The closely related short-billed gull was formerly often included in this species, which was then sometimes known collectively as "mew gull".

== Taxonomy ==
The common gull was formally described in 1758 by the Swedish naturalist Carl Linnaeus in the tenth edition of his Systema Naturae under the current binomial name Larus canus. Linnaeus specified the type locality as Europe but this is now restricted to Sweden. The genus name is a Latin word for a seabird, probably a gull. The specific epithet canus is also Latin and means "grey". The name "common gull" was coined by Thomas Pennant in 1768 because he considered it the most numerous of its genus. John Ray earlier used the name common sea-mall.

There are many old British regional names for this species, typically variations on maa, mar, and mew. The original English word mew is related to German möwe and Dutch meeuw, and is ultimately onomatopoeic. In Norse influenced regions of Britain, variations include maw or sea-maw, the old Norfolk form being mow. The word gull comes from a Celtic root, with the first recorded usage in English from the 1400s; the modern Welsh form is gwylan.

=== Subspecies ===
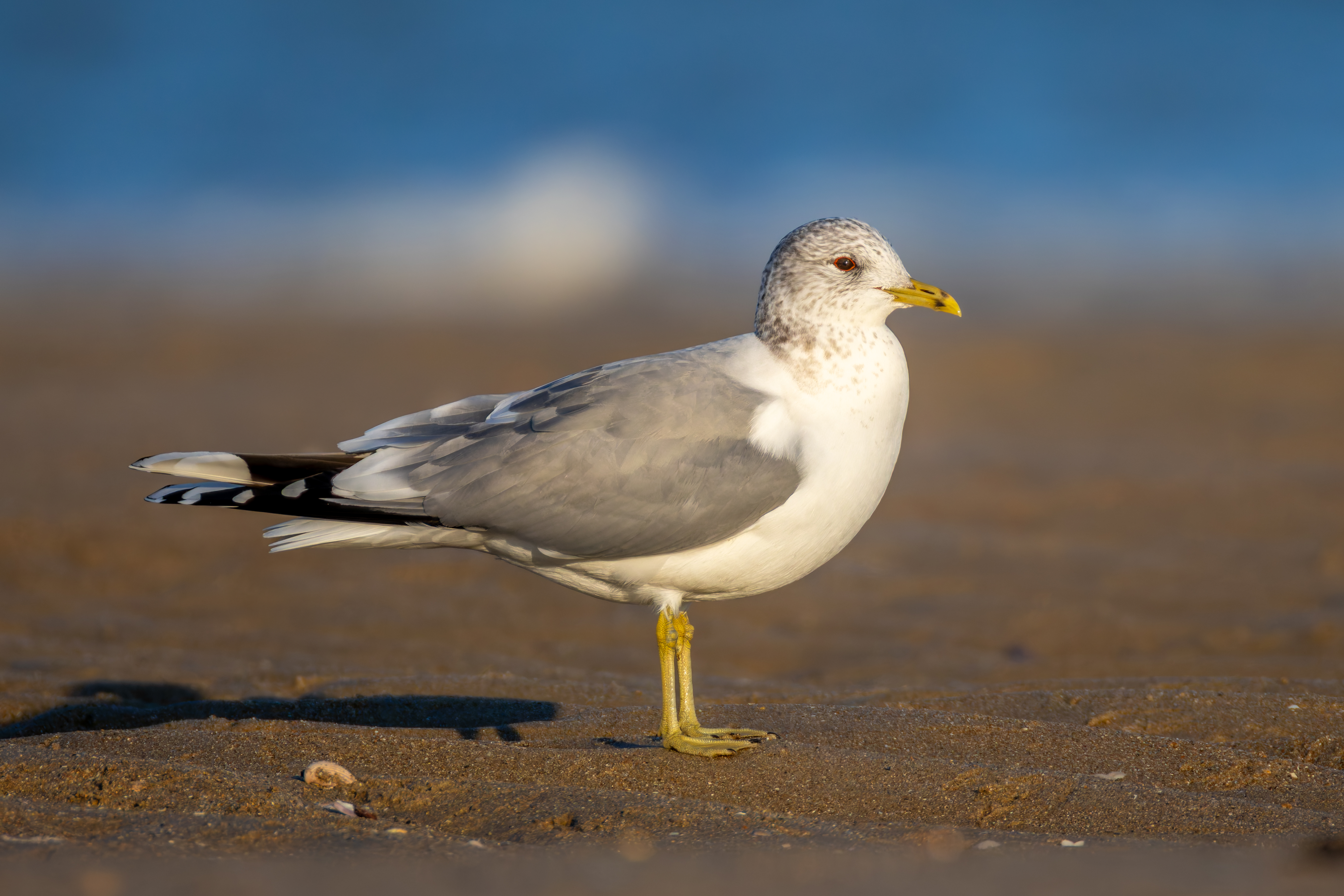
Winter plumage

There are three subspecies, with the Kamchatka gull (L. (c.) kamtschatschensis) being considered a potential distinct species by some authorities.

Image	Subspecies	Description	Distribution
	L. c. canus Linnaeus, 1758; Common gull	The nominate subspecies; small, mantle medium grey (the palest subspecies); wingtips with extensive black; iris dark. First-year birds develop white feathers on the head and belly with fine dark markings. Wingspan 110–125 cm (43–49 in); weight 290–480 g (10–17 oz).	Breeds in northern Europe and northwestern Asia, wintering mainly in western Europe.
	L. c. heinei Homeyer, 1853; Russian common gull	Larger than L. c. canus with a more sloping forehead, which gives the appearance of a smaller bill. Eyes are usually paler, bill and legs deeper yellow than L. c. canus with weaker dark bill markings in winter. The wings are proportionally longer with more black on p5-p8 than L. c. canus with narrow white spots forming a conspicuous "string of pearls". p4 has black markings which are rare in L. c. canus. First-year immatures have a whiter head, belly and underwings than L. c. canus at the same age, with an unmarked rump and more defined black tail band. Intergrades are common in west Russia. Weight 315–550 g (11.1–19.4 oz).	Breeds in north central Asia, winters in southeastern Europe, southwestern and eastern Asia (eastern China, Korea).
	L. c. kamtschatschensis Bonaparte, 1857 syn. L. kamtschatschensis Kamchatka gull	The largest subspecies, its size intermediate between common and ring-billed gulls with the largest males approaching the size of black-tailed gulls. Head is squarer with a flatter forehead and the bill is thicker and longer than L. c. canus, with paler eyes and deeper yellow bill and legs. Mantle medium-dark grey; wingtips with extensive black, with markings on p5–p8 forming a "string of pearls". Plumage development is generally slower than L. c. canus; first-year immatures retain juvenile feathers through the winter, appearing darker and browner overall, and the tail has more extensive black. Brown covert wing feathers are still retained in the second winter. Weight 394–586 g (13.9–20.7 oz).	Breeds in northeastern Asia, winters in eastern Asia (Japan, Korea, Sakhalin).

The North American short-billed gull was formerly widely considered conspecific with this species (as Larus canus brachyrhynchus), but most authorities now accept it as a distinct species L. brachyrhynchus, based on differences in genetics, morphology and calls. Though the name "mew gull" was then widely used outside of North America as its unique subspecific name, this name was also used in North America for Larus canus as a whole, so the name "short-billed gull" was chosen for L. brachyrhynchus by the American Ornithological Society (AOS) to avoid confusion with this North American usage of mew gull to denote all forms of the L. canus complex. The revival of the name short-billed gull in some of the same literature for L. brachyrhynchus, and that that short-billed gull was used historically for L. brachyrhynchus when it was treated as a distinct species in the first to third editions of the AOU (now AOS) checklist (in which the name mew gull, contrary to more recent usage, was specifically reserved for the Old World subspecies).

== Description ==
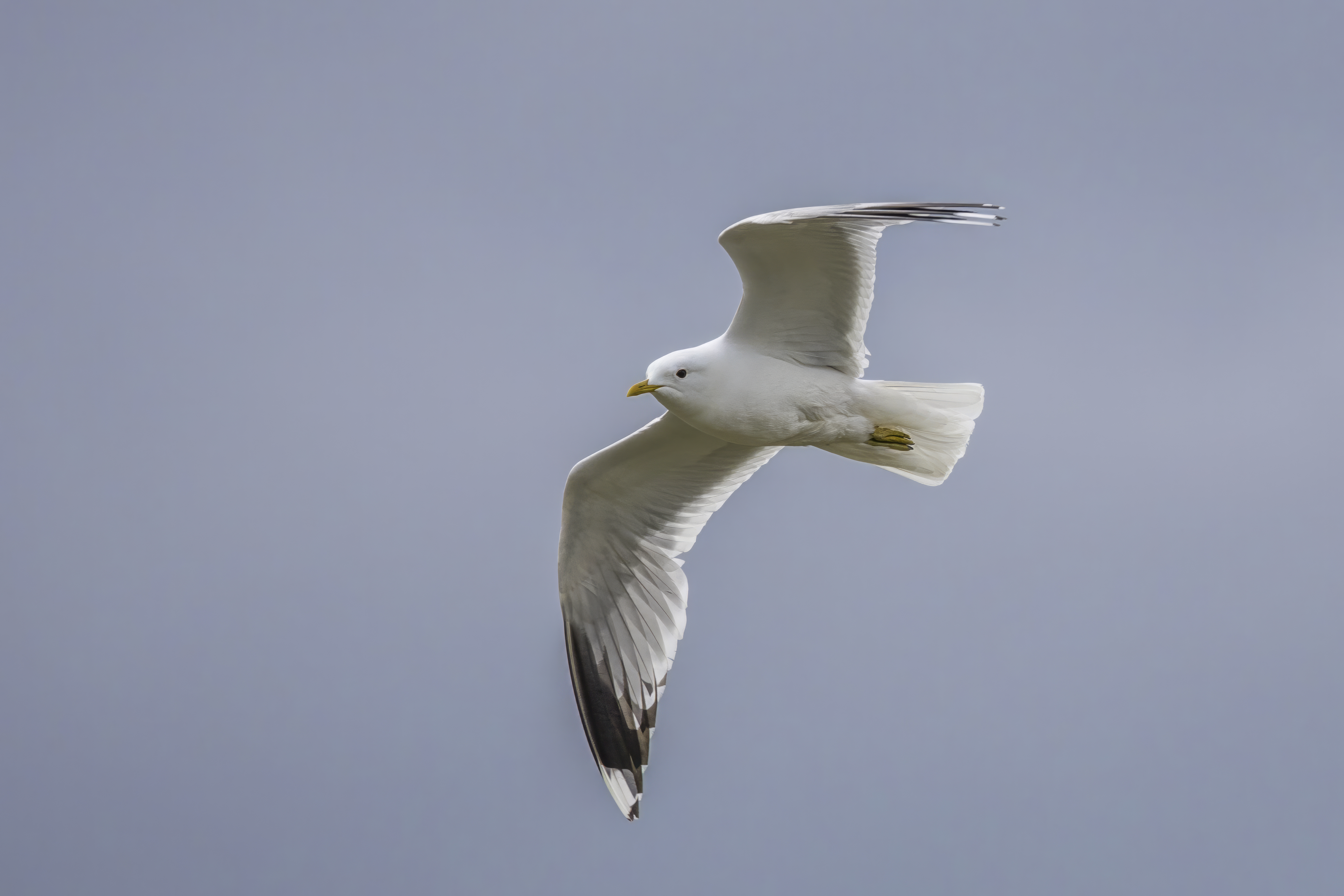
Adult breeding plumage, Norway

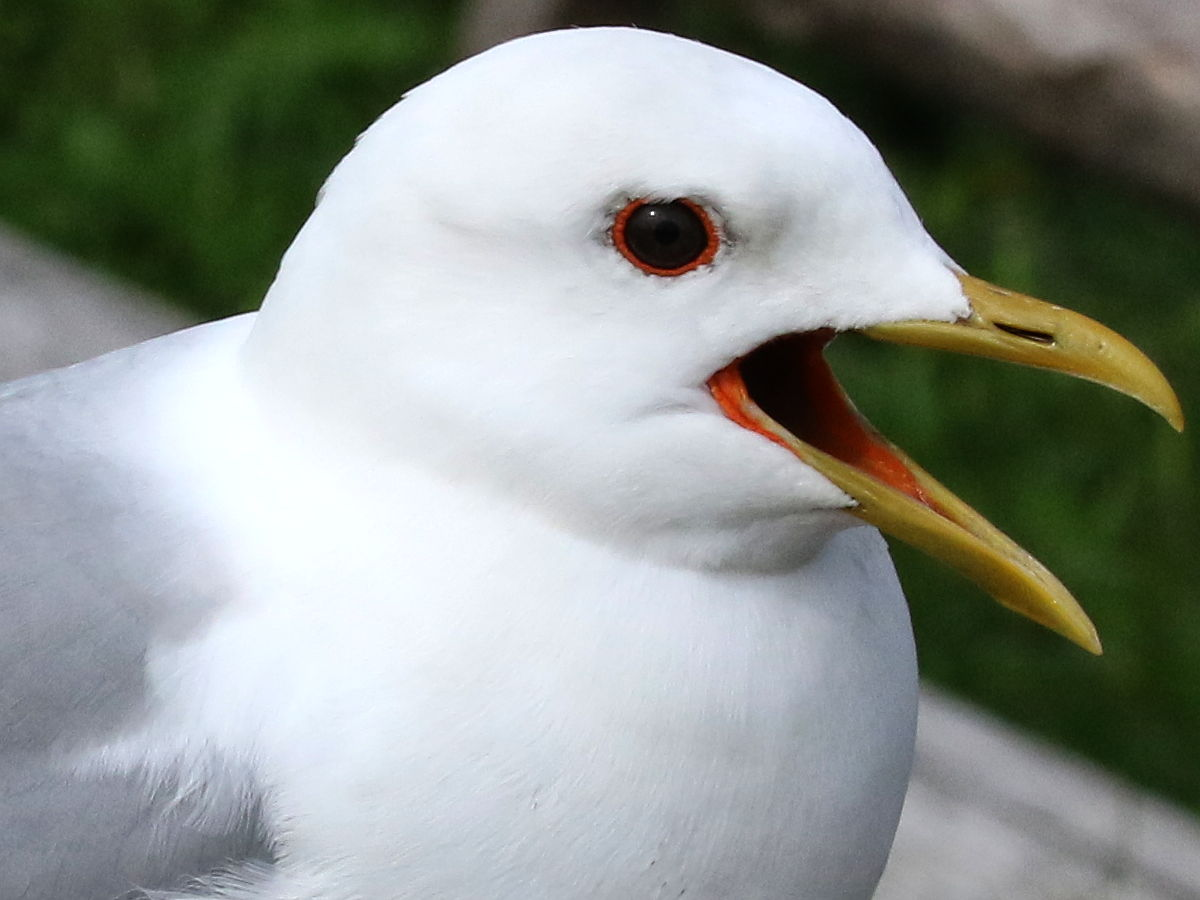
Breeding adults have red rings around dark eyes Kizhi Island, Russia

Adult common gulls are 40–46 cm (16–18 in) long and a wingspan of 100–115 cm (39–45 in), noticeably smaller than the herring gull and slightly smaller than the ring-billed gull. It is further distinguished from the ring-billed gull by its shorter, more tapered bill, which is a more greenish shade of yellow and is unmarked during the breeding season. The body is grey above and white below. The legs are yellow in breeding season, becoming duller in the winter. In winter, the head is streaked grey and the bill often has a poorly defined blackish band near the tip, which is sometimes sufficiently obvious to cause confusion with ring-billed gull. They have black wingtips with large white "mirrors" on the outer primaries p9 and p10, which are smaller than those in the short-billed gull. Young birds have scaly black-brown upperparts and a neat wing pattern, and pink legs which become greyish in the second year before tuning yellow. By the first winter, the head and belly are white, with fine streaks and greyish feathers grow on the saddle. They take three years (up to four in the Kamchatka subspecies) to reach maturity. The call is a high-pitched "laughing" cry.

== Distribution ==
The common gull breeds in the northern Palearctic from Iceland eastwards to northeast Siberia. It is mainly migratory and winters in Europe, the Mediterranean, Black and Caspian seas, Persian Gulf; Sea of Okhotsk, Japan, Korean Peninsula to southeast China.

It occurs as a scarce winter visitor to coastal eastern Canada and as a vagrant to the northeastern US. The Kamchatka gull is occasionally seen in northwestern North America mainly in spring, and there is one autumn record in Newfoundland.

== Behaviour and ecology ==
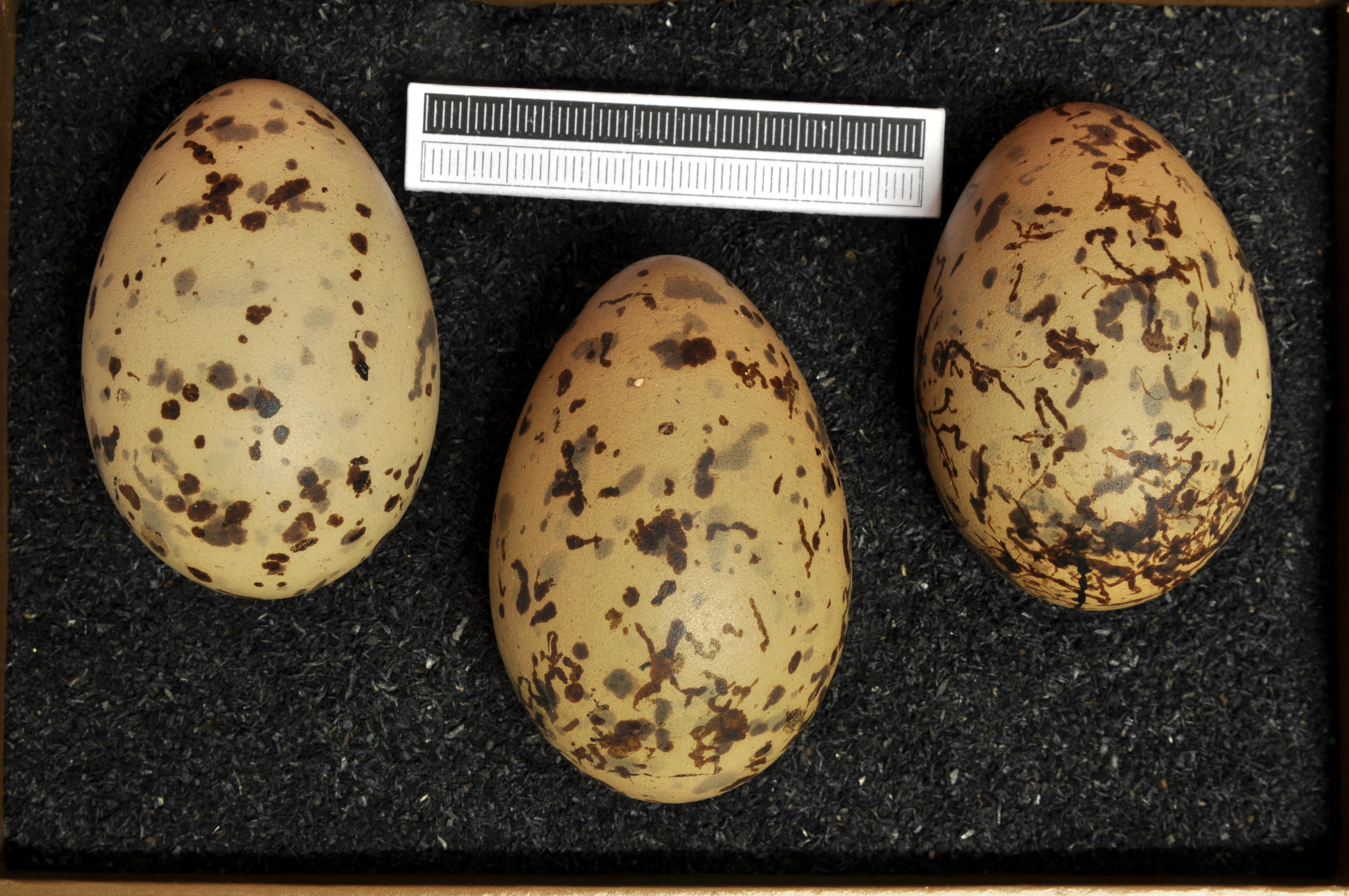
Eggs, Collection Museum Wiesbaden

=== Breeding ===
The common gull usually breeds colonially, but can be solitary. Both sexes make a lined nest on the ground or in a small tree near water or in marshes. Usually three eggs are laid (sometimes just one or two). They are incubated by both parents and hatch after 24–26 days. The chicks are precocial but remain in the vicinity of the nest. They are cared for by both parents and fledge when aged around 35 days.

=== Food and feeding ===
Like most gulls, they are omnivores and will scavenge as well as hunt small prey. The global population is estimated to be about one million pairs; they are most numerous in Europe, with over half (possibly as much as 80–90%) of the world population. By contrast, the short-billed gull population in Alaska is only about 10,000 pairs.

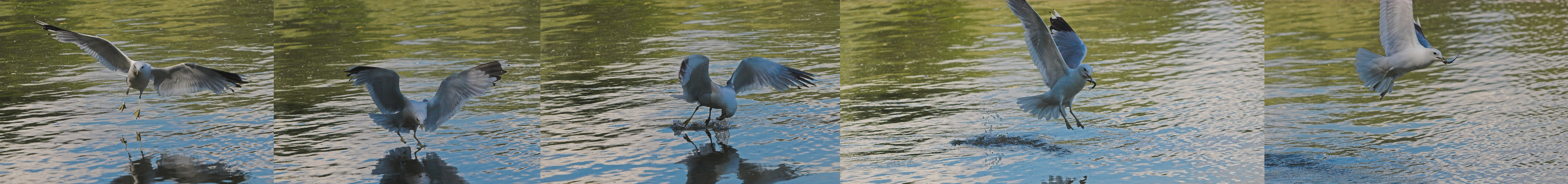
Larus canus fishing sequence

== Sources ==
- Cramp, Stanley, ed. (1983). "Larus canus Common gull". Handbook of the Birds of Europe the Middle East and North Africa. The Birds of the Western Palearctic. Vol. III: Waders to Gulls. Oxford: Oxford University Press. pp. 790–801. ISBN 978-0-19-857506-1.
- Lockwood, William Burley (1993) [1984]. The Oxford Dictionary of British Bird Names (2nd ed.). Oxford: Oxford University Press. ISBN 978-0-19-866196-2.
