= Peter Olver =

Peter Olver may refer to:

- Peter Olver (RAF officer) (1917–2013), British World War II Royal Air Force pilot
- Peter J. Olver (born 1952), professor of mathematics at the University of Minnesota
