= Gidea Park Sports Ground =

Cricket ground in Gidea Park, Romford, England

Coordinates: 51.5920°N 0.2086°E

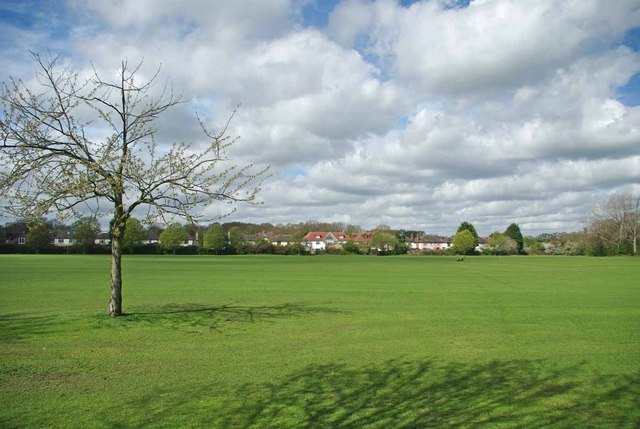
- Interactive map of Gidea Park Sports Ground

Ground information
- Location: Gidea Park, Romford, England
- Country: England
- Establishment: 1948 (first recorded match)

Team information
Essex	(1950–1968)
- As of 12 September 2010; Source: Ground profile

Gidea Park Sports Ground is a cricket ground in Gidea Park, Romford, England. The first recorded match on the ground was in 1948, when the Essex Second XI played the Sussex Second XI in the Minor Counties Championship.

Essex played their first first-class match there in 1950, when they played Hampshire. From 1950 to 1968 the ground played host to 34 first-class matches, the last of which saw Essex play Surrey.

In local domestic cricket, the ground is the home venue of Gidea Park and Romford Cricket Club who play in the Essex Premier League.
