= Ray Smith (cricketer) =

English cricketer

Personal information
- Full name: Raymond Smith
- Born: 10 August 1914; Boreham, Essex, United Kingdom
- Died: 21 February 1996 (aged 81); Kidderminster, Worcestershire, United Kingdom
- Batting: Right-handed
- Bowling: Right arm fast medium; Off break
- Role: All-rounder

Domestic team information
- Years: Team
- 1934–1956: Essex

Career statistics
Competition	FC
Matches	445
Runs scored	12041
Batting average	20.27
100s/50s	8/51
Top score	147
Balls bowled	86610
Wickets	1350
Bowling average	30.56
5 wickets in innings	73
10 wickets in match	10
Best bowling	8/63
Catches/stumpings	192/0
- Source: Cricinfo, 20 July 2013

Ray Smith (10 August 1914 – 21 February 1996) was an English cricketer. He played for Essex between 1934 and 1956.

== Career ==
Smith was a prominent all-rounder in the post-war Essex cricket team, alongside his cousin Peter. He was known for his dynamic bowling, often initiating the attack with rapid in-swingers, and then switching to less effective off-breaks. Smith's batting was sporadically powerful, with three of his eight first-class centuries recorded as the fastest in their respective seasons. Notably harsh on off-spinners, he once left bowler Jim Laker exasperated. Contrary to fast-bowling norms, Smith's appeals were delivered in a soft, aristocratic voice.

Retiring in 1956, he missed the introduction of one-day cricket but had an accomplished career as a coach at Felsted and ran a restaurant outside Birmingham. His final home match saw Essex secure its first victory over Yorkshire since the war, with Smith scoring the winning runs.
