= E. J. Mishan =

British economist

Ezra J. Mishan (a.k.a. "Edward"; 15 November 1917 – 22 September 2014) was an English economist best known for his work criticising economic growth. Between 1956 and 1977 he worked at the London School of Economics where he became Professor of Economics. In 1965, while at the LSE, he wrote his seminal work The Costs of Economic Growth, but was unable to find a publisher until 1967. In this work he expanded on his original 1960 thesis which stated that the "precondition of sustained growth is sustained discontent", warning developing nations that "the thorny path to industrialisation leads, after all, only to the waste land of Subtopia". The Costs of Economic Growth presaged many of the concerns of the Green movement that followed.

== See also ==
- Degrowth

== Bibliography ==
- Welfare Economics, Random House, 1964.
- The Costs of Economic Growth, Staples Press, 1967.
- 21 Popular Economic Fallacies, Allen Lane, 1969.
- [ Growth:The Price We Pay, Staples Press, 1969.]
- Cost-Benefit Analysis, Allen & Unwin, 1971.
- Pornography, Psychedelics and Technology: Essays on the Limits to Freedom, Allen & Unwin, 1980.
- Economic Myths and the Mythology of Economics, Prentice Hall / Harvester Wheatsheaf, 1986.
- Thirteen Persistent Economic Fallacies, Praeger, 2009.
- [ Technological unemployment: Why there are hard times ahead, Political Quarterly, 1996.]
