= George Higgins (cricketer) =

English cricketer

George Frederick Higgins (25 December 1868 – 19 August 1951) was an English cricketer active from 1894 to 1895 who played for Essex. He was born in London and died in Woodford Green. He appeared in nine first-class matches as a righthanded batsman who scored 306 runs with a highest score of 118.
