= Maria Dickin =

British social reformer and animal welfare pioneer

- Dickin in 1950
- Born: Maria Elisabeth Dickin; 22 September 1870; South Hackney, Middlesex, England
- Died: 1 March 1951 (aged 80); London, England
- Other names: Mia
- Occupations: Social reformer, animal welfare pioneer

Maria Elisabeth Dickin CBE (nickname Mia; 22 September 1870 – 1 March 1951) was a social reformer and an animal welfare pioneer who founded the People's Dispensary for Sick Animals (PDSA) in 1917. The Dickin Medal is named for her.

== Early life ==
Maria Dickin was born in 1870 in South Hackney, Middlesex (now in the London Borough of Hackney, the oldest of eight children born to William George Dickin, a Wesleyan minister, and Ellen Maria Exell Dickin.

== Career ==
Dickin taught singing as a young woman, and in 1905 compiled and published Suggestive Thoughts from the Temple (1905), a collection of sayings by London minister Reginald John Campbell.

She founded the People's Dispensary for Sick Animals (PDSA) in 1917, in a cellar in Whitechapel. The sign on the door reflected Dickin's intent, to provide humane veterinary care to pets whose owners could not otherwise afford it: "Bring your sick animals/Do not let them suffer/All animals treated/All treatment free". In 1921, she added a horse-drawn mobile unit, to treat more animals and bring public health education to other neighborhoods; this was the first of a fleet of travelling veterinary clinics. She opened a rest home for horses and donkeys in 1928, and in 1929, she began Busy Bees, a children's club focused on animal welfare.

Dickin was appointed OBE in 1929, and became a Commander of the Order of the British Empire in 1948. During World War II, she launched the PDSA medal, for animal heroism in the war effort. In 1950, she published a memoir, The Cry of the Animal.

Dickin, whose efforts depended more on the work of amateur volunteers than trained veterinarians, was opposed by the Royal College of Veterinary Surgeons as "dangerous". "If you are so concerned about the proper treatment of Sick Animals of the Poor," she responded to the professional association's criticisms, "Do the same work we are doing. Instead of spending your energy and time in hindering us, spend it in dealing with this mass of misery."

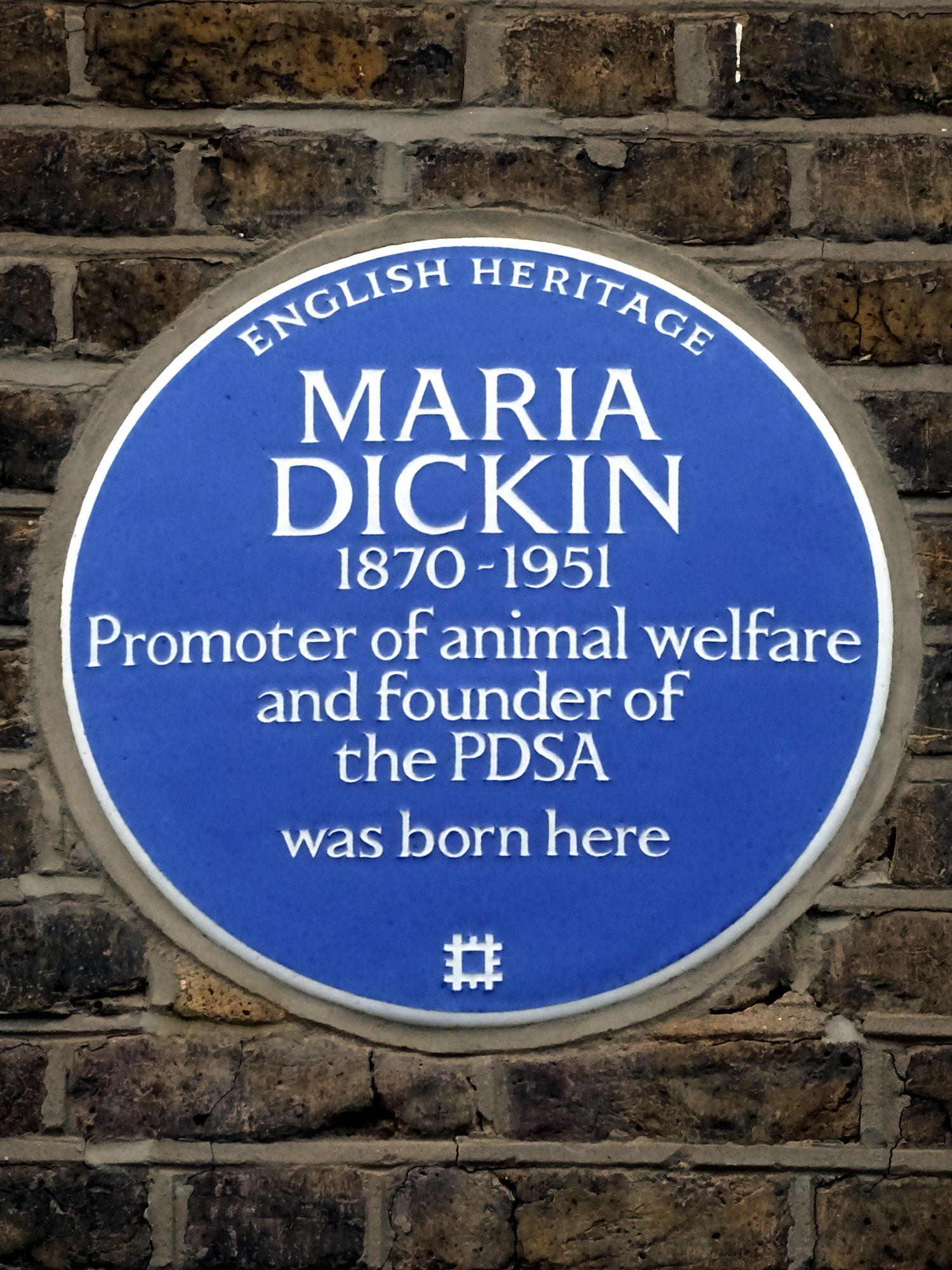
Blue plaque at Dickin's birthplace in Hackney.

== Personal life and legacy ==
Dickin married her first cousin, Arnold Francis Dickin, an accountant, in 1899; they had no children. Dickin died in London in 1951 of influenzal broncho-pneumonia, aged 80 years.

The PDSA medal is now known as the Dickin Medal, and is considered the animal equivalent of the Victoria Cross. A commemorative blue plaque was erected by English Heritage at Dickin's birthplace, 41 Cassland Road (formerly 1 Farringdon Terrace) in Hackney in October 2015.
