= Peter Smith (English cricketer, born 1908) =

English cricketer

Personal information
- Full name: Thomas Peter Bromley Smith
- Born: 30 October 1908; Ipswich, Suffolk, England
- Died: 4 August 1967 (aged 58); Hyères, Var, France
- Batting: Right-handed
- Bowling: Legbreak googly

International information
- National side: England
- Test debut: 17 August 1946 v India
- Last Test: 21 March 1947 v New Zealand

Career statistics
| Competition | Tests | First-class |
|---|---|---|
| Matches | 4 | 465 |
| Runs scored | 33 | 10,142 |
| Batting average | 6.59 | 17.95 |
| 100s/50s | 0/0 | 8/32 |
| Top score | 24 | 163 |
| Balls bowled | 538 | 95,007 |
| Wickets | 3 | 1,697 |
| Bowling average | 106.33 | 26.55 |
| 5 wickets in innings | 0 | 122 |
| 10 wickets in match | 0 | 28 |
| Best bowling | 2/172 | 9/77 |
| Catches/stumpings | 1/– | 345/– |
- Source: CricInfo, 14 December 2018

Thomas Peter Bromley Smith (30 October 1908 − 4 August 1967) was an English cricketer, who played for Essex and England. Smith was one of the five Wisden Cricketers of the Year in 1947. An all-rounder, Smith played for Essex from 1929 to 1951.

Peter Smith was a leg-break and googly bowler and a lower order hitter of some style. He holds the Essex records both for the number of wickets in a season (172 in 1947), and for wickets in a career (1,610 between 1929 and 1951).

Smith originally turned up at The Oval for the 1933 Test match against the West Indies, only to find that the telegram he had received was a hoax. It was another thirteen years before he was really selected for his country. He was noted for keeping to a good length, even when Hugh Bartlett smacked 28 off his six deliveries in the 1938 Gentlemen v. Players match at Lord's.

He served in World War II, joining the British Army on 1 September 1939, where he was commissioned as a second lieutenant into the Essex Regiment in June 1940. Posted to the 2/4th Battalion, he served there for nearly three years before being sent to the Middle East in May 1943, becoming a staff officer at Combined Operations HQ at Alexandria.

While playing for Essex against Derbyshire at Queen's Park, Chesterfield in 1947, he batted at number eleven, and came to the wicket with Essex 199 for 9 wickets. In two-and-a-half hours, Smith hit 163 runs, putting on 218 for the last wicket with Frank Vigar, who made an undefeated 114. Smith's 163 is the world record score for a number eleven batsman, and the partnership is one of only eleven of more than 200 runs for the last wicket in the whole of first-class cricket. In that season of 1947, Smith achieved the double of 1,000 runs and 100 wickets, and also established the record for most runs conceded in a season: 4667.

Smith played only four Test matches for England: one in 1946 against India, two against Australia in the 1946–47 Ashes series and the last in New Zealand later on the tour. As a Test player, he was only modestly successful, but in taking 9/121 runs for the MCC against New South Wales he set the record for the best bowling return by an Englishman in Australia.

Peter Smith died in Hyères, France from a cerebral haemorrhage after a fall on holiday.
