= Denis Eadie =

British Army officer

- Denis Eadie 1917-2015
- Born: 12 February 1917; Bridge of Weir, Scotland
- Died: 28 March 2015 (aged 98); Edinburgh, Scotland
- Spouses: Isobel Woodsend (1940-1983 *her death), Gillian Apold (née Maclean) (1991-2015 *his death)
- Relatives: Peter Eadie (Ggeat-grandfather)
- Military career
- Allegiance: United Kingdom
- Branch: Army
- Service years: 1939-1947
- Rank: Major (Honorary)
- Service number: 96390
- Units: 506 Field Company Royal Engineers (Scottish Lowland Division); 21 Field Park Company
- Second World War: Battle of France; Arakan Campaign; Battle of Kohima
- Awards: Military Cross
- Other work: Business (Eadie Bros & Co Ltd)

Denis Sheldon McGregor Eadie MC (12 February 1917 – 28 March 2015) was a British Army officer of the Second World War who was awarded the Military Cross by Field Marshal Lord Wavell for his conduct during the relief of Kohima.

== Early life ==
Eadie was born on 12 February 1917 Bridge of Weir in Scotland. He was the great-grandson of Peter Eadie, who founded the family firm, Eadie Bros & Co. Ltd. The company specialised in the manufacture of ring travellers for the textile industry.

Educated in Scotland he then followed his older brother Russell to St Piran's prep school in Maidenhead and Oundle School in Peterborough. For university Eadie went up to Trinity College, Cambridge. There he studied mechanical sciences and won a rowing blue stroking the Cambridge crew during the 1938 University Boat Race.

== Military service ==
With Britain's declaration of war on Nazi Germany on 3 September 1939 Eadie was commissioned into 506 Field Company Royal Engineers, within the Scottish Lowland Division.

Eadie attended the Royal Military Academy Sandhurst, where he trained as a motor contact officer. Upon graduating he was posted to Sixth Brigade HQ and sailed for France in April 1940 to join the British Expeditionary Force. His sailing came the day after his proposal of marriage to Isobel Woodsend.

During the Battle of France Eadie was Mentioned in Dispatches before being evacuated from Dunkirk. He remained on service in the UK until 1942 and his deployment to Burma. While on home service Eadie married Woodsend at Paisley Abbey in December 1940.

In Burma, Eadie participated in the 1942 Arakan Campaign and was training on the west coast of India when he was sent to participate in the Battle of Kohima.

On 2 May 1944 Eadie and his men were ordered to take a six-pounder anti-tank gun up to the Kohima garrison. Manhandling the gun past the Japanese, they then pulled it up to a 90 ft ramp. During the operation at the ramp, hauling the gun using a wire cable, one soldier was killed and another wounded. The troop sergeant was injured when he was run over by the gun. Eadie carried the casualties up the ramp, getting them under cover.

For his bravery during the battle Eadie was awarded the Military Cross, presented in the field. The citation read:

"Captain Eadie throughout the whole of the operation displayed a high standard of leadership and organising ability while under fire. The success of the operation was entirely due to his example and his rapid appreciation of the situation."

Eadie was made a temporary major and given command after the death of his commanding officer. He saw further service in the Far East with the liberation of Mandalay and Rangoon, arriving on Victory in Europe Day.

Six years to the day after his 3 September 1939 enlistment, he was stationed at Mingaladon Airport. He was assigned to a Bangkok flight which returned with the first British prisoners of war.

He returned to the UK two months later but was not released from service until December 1947. Eadie remained on the Territorial Army Reserve Officers List. He was removed from the list on 12 February 1967, upon reaching the upper age limit. He was awarded the honorary rank of major.

== Later life ==
After completing his military service, Eadie returned to the family firm in Scotland. He worked there until he retired on his 65th birthday in 1982.

He maintained a keen interest in sport. He coached underprivileged boys in boxing, and was a Royal and Ancient Golf Club member, Prestwick Golf Club captain and Leander Rowing Club member. He also enjoyed fishing and shooting.

Eadie served as chairman of ISO Standards committees relating to textiles, the West of Scotland TSB (in addition to being a member of the bank's board), as a Paisley Hammerman Deacon, and as a Grocer's Company member.

Eadie also carried out volunteer work and supported charities. These included the Paisley & Glasgow Society, Paisley's Accord Hospice, Paisley Abbey and St. Mary's Cathedral, Edinburgh.

He was widowed in 1983 with the passing of his wife Isobel. In 1991 he married again, to Gillian Apold (née Maclean). She survived him, along with two sons, two daughters, a stepson and a stepdaughter.
