= Bill Cross =

British soldier

William James Cross
- William James Cross (1917–2015)
- Born: 21 November 1917; Scunthorpe, Lincolnshire, England
- Died: 29 June 2015 (aged 97)
- Military career
- Allegiance: United Kingdom
- Branch: British Army
- Service years: 1934-1977
- Rank: Corporal of Horse
- Units: Royal Scots Greys; Life Guards
- Conflicts: Arab revolt in Palestine; World War II
- Awards: Legion of Honour – (2015)
- Other work: Barclays Bank; Hospital Porter

Corporal of Horse William James Cross (21 November 1917 – 29 June 2015) was a soldier of the British Army who fought in numerous campaigns during World War II. He participated in battles in Palestine, Salerno, and at Normandy. In 2015, he was awarded the Légion d’honneur.

== Early life and career ==
Cross was born at Scunthorpe on 21 November 1917, the son of soldier from the Coldstream Guards who served in the First World War.

He followed in his father's footsteps, enlisting in the British Army in September 1934 as a Band Boy with the Royal Scots Greys. He earned the George V Jubilee and George VI Coronation Medals, being present on both occasions as a mounted musician.

Under the British Mandate in Palestine, Cross served with the Arab Legion under the command of Glubb Pasha in 1938.

== Second World War ==
Cross was captured during fighting in Syria which was controlled by Vichy France. During the battle he was taken prisoner by the French Foreign Legion. After six weeks as a prisoner of war Cross was evacuated to Egypt where he re-joined his regiment. It was while in Egypt that Cross was temporarily blinded after being injured in an air raid. After treatment at the 106 (South African) General Hospital on the Suez Canal Zone, he regained sight in one eye. This enabled him to get back to his regiment and advance with the 7th Armoured Division at the Battle of El Alamein.

Following his service in Africa, Cross landed with allied forces in Italy at Salerno. He was then withdrawn to the UK in readiness for the D-Day Landings.

On 28 June 1944, Cross landed on Sword Beach with 22 Armoured Brigade. In January 1945 Cross transferred to the Life Guards, where he became a corporal of horse and finished his war service at Wismar on the shores of the Baltic Sea.

== Later service and post military career ==
Cross was a trumpeter in the Life Guards during the coronation of Queen Elizabeth II in 1953 and received a third Coronation Medal at that time. He followed this with her Jubilee Medal and two foreign awards.

He joined the Honourable Artillery Company in 1964 and earned their service and good conduct medal.

Cross retired from the army in 1977 after 43 years’ service.

After retiring from the army, Cross worked at Barclays Bank and as a hospital porter.

== Retirement ==
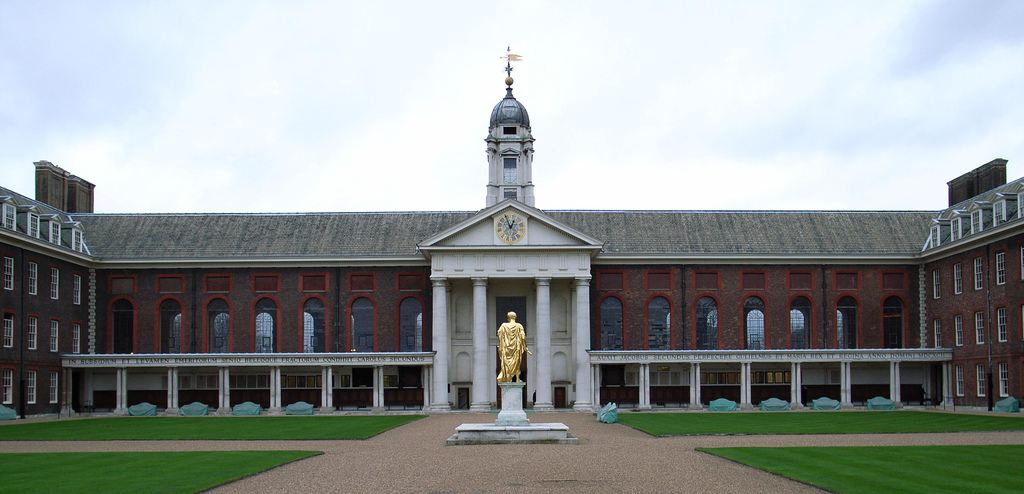
Royal Hospital Chelsea

In 1999 he joined the Royal Hospital Chelsea. As a Chelsea Pensioner still he played in the band there as well as joining the bowls team.

In 2006 he was the subject of portrait in oil by Jennifer McRae in his Chelsea uniform, one of a series of portraits of Chelsea pensioners created by McRae. The painting is on permanent loan to the Royal Hospital.

In 2015 he was one of 19 Chelsea Pensioners presented with the Légion d’honneur by the French Ambassador to the United Kingdom, Madame Sylvie Bermann.

Cross died on 29 June 2015, he was a widower and was survived by his son Malcolm.
