= Eleanor Mears =

Scottish medical practitioner and campaigner (1917–1992)

- Born: Ellen Cowie Loudon; 9 December 1917; Cleland, North Lanarkshire
- Died: 18 May 1992 (aged 74); Sleaford, Lincolnshire, England
- Occupation(s): Medical practitioner Campaigner
- Years active: 1940–1992

Eleanor Cowie [Ellen Cowie] Mears (née Loudon; 9 December 1917 – 18 May 1992) was a Scottish medical practitioner and campaigner. She began working in the medical practice when she took over the London practice of a male doctor who was enlisted for the war effort. Mears became popular with the women in her cachement area who discussed their gynaelogocial problems in a way they could not do so with male doctors. She later moved to Christchurch, New Zealand after the Second World War before returning to London in 1954 and becoming the Family Planning Association's first medical secretary and was then made the Planned Parenthood Federation's medical secretary. Mears was a fellow of both the Royal Society of Medicine and the Society for Endocrinology and was a medical campaigner on abortion and euthanasia issues.

== Early life ==
On 9 December 1917, Mears was born in Willowbank, Cleland, North Lanarkshire, in Scotland. Her family was the Loudon family, who were successful builders in the local area. Mears was the second of three children to the builder William Loudon, and his wife Helen Cowie, née Robertson. She was intended to be christened Ellen but the name was misheard and the name was put as Helen on her birth certificate instead. Between 1924 and 1930, Mears attended school in Cleland before moving to Wishaw High School until 1935. She went on to study medicine at the University of Edinburgh despite her parents believing a woman should not be working in the medical profession. Mears was a popular and prominent student, holding left-wing political views. She was a member of the Student Christian Movement, occasionally preached in the Royal Infirmary of Edinburgh, and played golf and hockey for the University of Edinburgh. In mid-1940, Mears graduated MB ChB.

== Career ==
At the age of 23, Mears moved to London and became the operator of a vacant practice of a male doctor, at a time when most men general practitioners were enlisted for the war effort. She went by the name of Eleanor, and she became popular with female patients in her area of practice who discussed their gynaecological problems that they would not talk about to a male doctor. Mears did not formally qualify to become a gynaecologist and was privately not agreeable to the surgical emphasis of a branch of medicine that was dominated by men. Nevertheless, she began taking an interest in women's medicine.

When the Second World War was over, Mears emigrated to New Zealand in 1946. She set up a specialist gynaecology practice for women in Christchurch. Mears established the Christchurch Marriage Guidance Council with two woman colleagues, and helped to set up the city's Family Planning Association. She also lectured and broadcast on radio and resisted pressure from both main political parties to stand for election to Parliament. Mears returned to Britain in 1956, exchanging practices for four months with fellow gynaecologist Joan Malleson, to broaden her professional opportunities. Following Malleson's death on her return journey to London, Mears purchased her practice and moved with her children to London. In 1958, she was appointed the Family Planning Association's first medical secretary and was then made the Planned Parenthood Federation's medical secretary. Mears was a fellow of the Royal Society of Medicine, as well as the Society for Endocrinology. She was a founder of the Institute of Psychosexual Medicine, advised the World Health Organization on matters relating to the control of population and was a member of both the Medical Advisory Council for the Investigation of Fertility Control and the Marriage Guidance Council.

In 1960, she authored the advice book called Marriage, a Continuing Relationship for newlywed couples and it suggested that women avoid promoting radical views of women's rights and instead assume a meek role. Mears wrote Handbook on Oral Contraception in 1965, and co-authored with Alan Gutmacher Babies by Choice or by Chance. She became head of research into all oral (and subsequently) inter-urine contraceptives, coordinating and observing every clinical trial conducted by pharmaceutical companies in the United Kingdom. Mears prescribed the drug Conovid to patients, believing that women should have the right to have control of their fertility and promoted oral contraceptives despite vocal opposition from her profession from individuals such as Edith Summerskill. She campaigned through the media for reform to laws regarding abortion that was put through Parliament by Edwin Brooks and David Steel in the late 1960s and, unsuccessfully, euthanasia. Mears later opened consulting rooms in Harley Street and moved to Grimsby from where she operated a clinic for psycho sexual problems on behalf of the Lincolnshire Health Authority.

== Personal life ==
Mears married a fellow medical student, Kenneth Patrick Geddes Mears, in 1940. They had three children and she independently conducted an abortion on her fourth, unwanted, pregnancy. They separated in 1954 and were later divorced. In 1968 she married the Grimsby fish wholesaler Francis Frederick Smith. She began suffering from Alzheimer's disease by 1987, and was admitted to Rauceby Hospital in Sleaford, where she died on 18 May 1992. She was buried at Grantham eight days later.
