= Harold Faragher =

English cricketer

Personal information
- Full name: Harold Alker Faragher
- Born: 20 July 1917; Reddish, Lancashire, England
- Died: 24 February 2006 (aged 88); Brentwood, Essex, England
- Batting: Right-handed
- Role: Batter

Domestic team information
- Years: Team
- 1949–1950: Essex

Career statistics
Competition	FC
Matches	6
Runs scored	274
Batting average	39.14
100s/50s	–/3
Top score	85*
Catches/stumpings	4/–
- Source: CricketArchive, 5 December 2024

Harold Alker Faragher (20 July 1917 – 24 February 2006) was an English cricketer. He played for Essex in 1949 and 1950.
