= Peter Olver (RAF officer) =

Royal Air Force fighter pilot (1917–2013)

- Born: 4 April 1917; Royal Leamington Spa, England
- Died: 14 February 2013 (aged 95); Wiltshire
- Military career
- Allegiance: United Kingdom
- Branch: Royal Air Force
- Service years: 1938-1945
- Rank: Wing Commander
- Units: No. 611 Squadron RAF; No. 603 Squadron RAF; No. 66 Squadron RAF; No. 238 Squadron RAF; No. 213 Squadron RAF; 1 Squadron SAAF
- Conflicts: World War II: Battle of Britain; Allied invasion of Sicily
- Awards: Distinguished Flying Cross

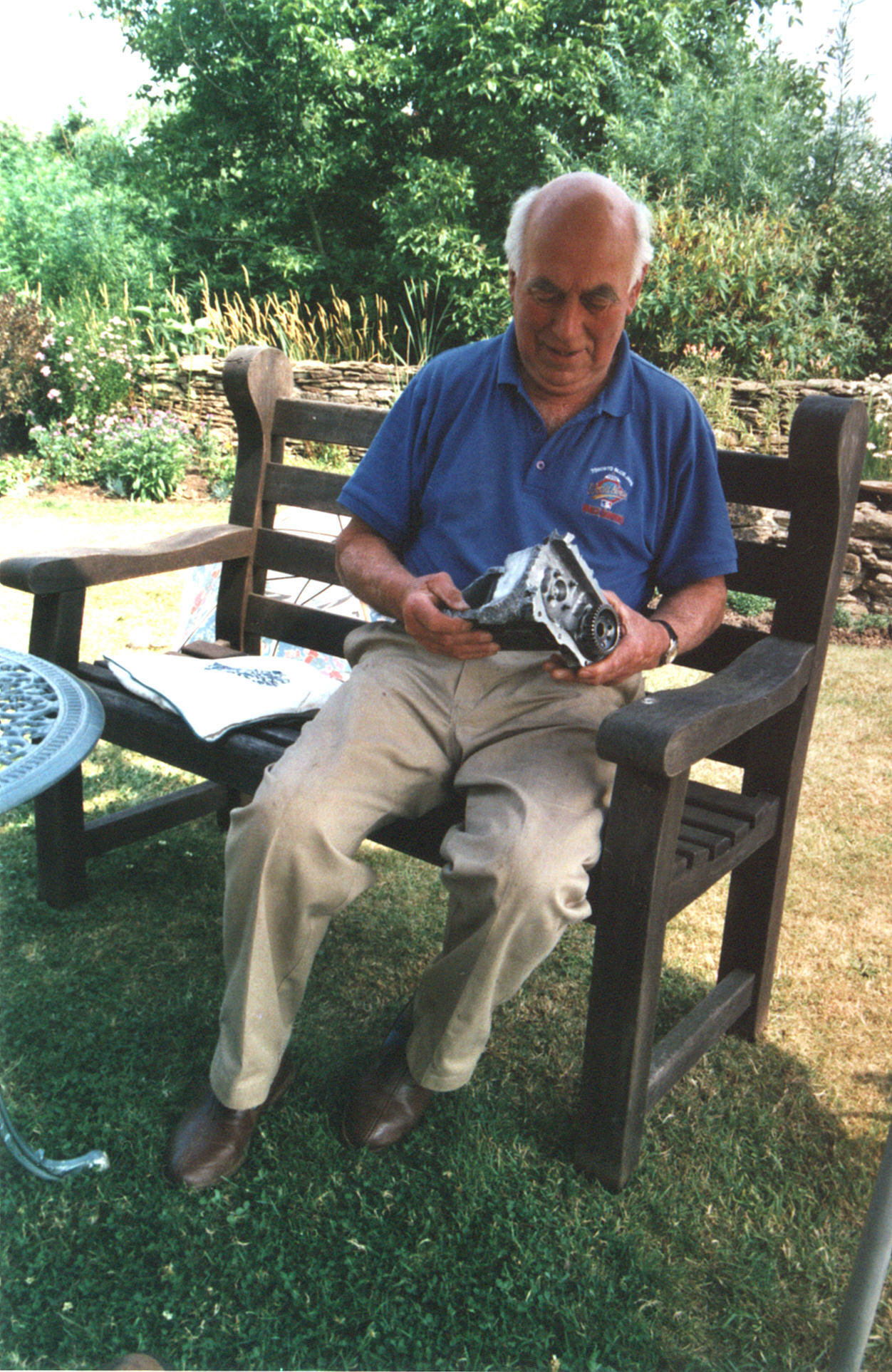
In 1999 Olver examines the generator from his Spitfire P7309 in which he was shot down on 25 October 1940.

Wing Commander Peter Olver, DFC (4 April 1917 – 14 February 2013) was a British World War II Royal Air Force Battle of Britain Supermarine Spitfire fighter ace.

== Biography ==
Olver was born in Royal Leamington Spa, Warwickshire. He trained as a pilot after joining the RAF Volunteer Reserve and joined No. 611 Squadron RAF in September 1940 as a Pilot Officer. He then joined No. 603 Squadron RAF based at RAF Hornchurch. On 25 October 1940 he bailed out of his Spitfire II P7309 near Brede, Sussex on his first sortie after being attacked by a Messerschmitt Bf 109 and was injured on landing. He quickly recovered and after claiming his first kill he joined No. 66 Squadron RAF with which he shot down at least three more aircraft. After posting to North Africa he became the commander of No. 238 Squadron RAF and No. 213 Squadron RAF flying the Hawker Hurricane and destroyed three Italian biplane fighters on the ground. Awarded the DFC, he commanded 1 Squadron SAAF flying MK V Spitfires, destroyed an Italian Macchi C.202 fighter and was promoted to Wing Commander when the existing commander was killed. Following the Allied invasion of Sicily he shot down an Bf 109 but was then himself attacked and crash landed. He then spent the remainder of the war as a PoW in camps, including Stalag Luft III.

== Later life ==
He married a Women's Auxiliary Air Force Officer and left the RAF to become a farmer in Kenya. After Kenyan Independence he returned to the UK where he farmed in Devon and Wiltshire. He had four sons.
