= Essex County Cricket Club =

Cricket club in England

- One Day name: Essex

Personnel
- Captain: tba
- Coach: Chris Silverwood

Team information
- Founded: 1876; 150 years ago
- Home ground: County Ground, Chelmsford
- Capacity: 5,500

History
- First-class debut: Leicestershire in 1894 at Leyton
- Championship wins: 8
- Pro40 wins: 5
- FP Trophy wins: 3
- Twenty20 Cup wins: 1
- B&H Cup wins: 2
- Bob Willis Trophy wins: 1
- Official website: EssexCricket

Essex County Cricket Club is one of eighteen first-class county clubs within the domestic cricket structure of England and Wales. It represents the historic county of Essex.

Founded in 1876, the club had minor county status until 1894 when it was promoted to first-class status pending its entry into the County Championship in 1895. Since then, the team has played in every top-level domestic cricket competition in England.

Essex currently play all their home games at the County Cricket Ground, Chelmsford. The club has formerly used other venues throughout the county including Lower Castle Park in Colchester, Valentines Park in Ilford, Leyton Cricket Ground, the Gidea Park Sports Ground in Romford, and Garon Park and Southchurch Park, both in Southend.

The limited overs team has previously been known as the Essex Eagles but now play simply as Essex.

== Honours ==
=== First XI honours ===
- County Championship (8) – 1979, 1983, 1984, 1986, 1991, 1992, 2017, 2019

Division Two (2) – 2002, 2016

- Sunday/Pro 40 League (5) – 1981, 1984, 1985, 2005, 2006

Division Two (1) – 2008

- Refuge Assurance Cup (1) - 1989
- Gillette/NatWest/C&G/Friends Provident Trophy (3) – 1985, 1997, 2008
- Twenty20 Cup (1) - 2019
- Benson & Hedges Cup (2) – 1979, 1998
- Bob Willis Trophy (1) – 2020

=== Second XI honours ===
- Second XI Championship (1) – 1973; shared (0) -
- Second XI Trophy (0) –
- Minor Counties Championship (0) – ; shared (0) -

== Earliest cricket in Essex ==
It is almost certain that cricket reached Essex by the 16th century and that it developed during the 17th century with inter-parish matches being played. The first definite mention of cricket in connection with the county is a highly controversial match in 1724 between Chingford and Edwin Stead's XI, which is recorded in The Dawn of Cricket by H. T. Waghorn. The venue is unknown but, if it was at Chingford, it is also the earliest reference to cricket being played in Essex as well as by an Essex team. The game echoed an earlier one in 1718 as the Chingford team refused to play to a finish when Stead's team had the advantage. A court case followed and, as in 1718, it was ordered to be played out, presumably so that all wagers could be fulfilled. Lord Chief Justice Pratt presided over the case, and he ordered them to play it out on Dartford Brent, though it is not known if this was the original venue. The game was completed in 1726.

The earliest reference to Essex in a team name is dated July 1732, when a combined Essex & Hertfordshire team played against London. In July 1737, there was London v Essex at the Artillery Ground, London winning by 45 runs. In a return game at Ilford on 1 August 1737, Essex won by 7 runs. References are then occasional until 1785 when the Hornchurch Cricket Club became prominent. Hornchurch had a strong team that was arguably representative of Essex as a county, and the sources differ among themselves on that point as both Essex and Hornchurch were used as the team name. Essex played in important matches until 1794, after which the county abruptly disappeared from the records for a long time. An Essex club was formed to play some minor matches in 1860. They held an Annual General Meeting in 1861, but there are no further references until 1876.

== Club history ==
Essex County Cricket Club was formed on 14 January 1876 at a meeting in the Shire Hall, Chelmsford. The new club had minor status initially, and played its inaugural first-class match on 14, 15 & 16 May 1894 against Leicestershire at Leyton. It was also Leicestershire's inaugural first-class match, and they won by 68 runs. Essex failed to win any of their inter-county matches that season.

Essex, Leicestershire, and Warwickshire joined the County Championship in 1895. In Essex's first match, James Burns scored 114 against Warwickshire at Edgbaston—the first century for Essex in first-class cricket. George Frederick Higgins scored their second century in the same match, putting on 205 with Burns for the fourth wicket. The club made a high score of 692 against Somerset with the veteran Bunny Lucas scoring 145, but the most notable feat was by Walter Mead who took 17/119 against Hampshire at Southampton.

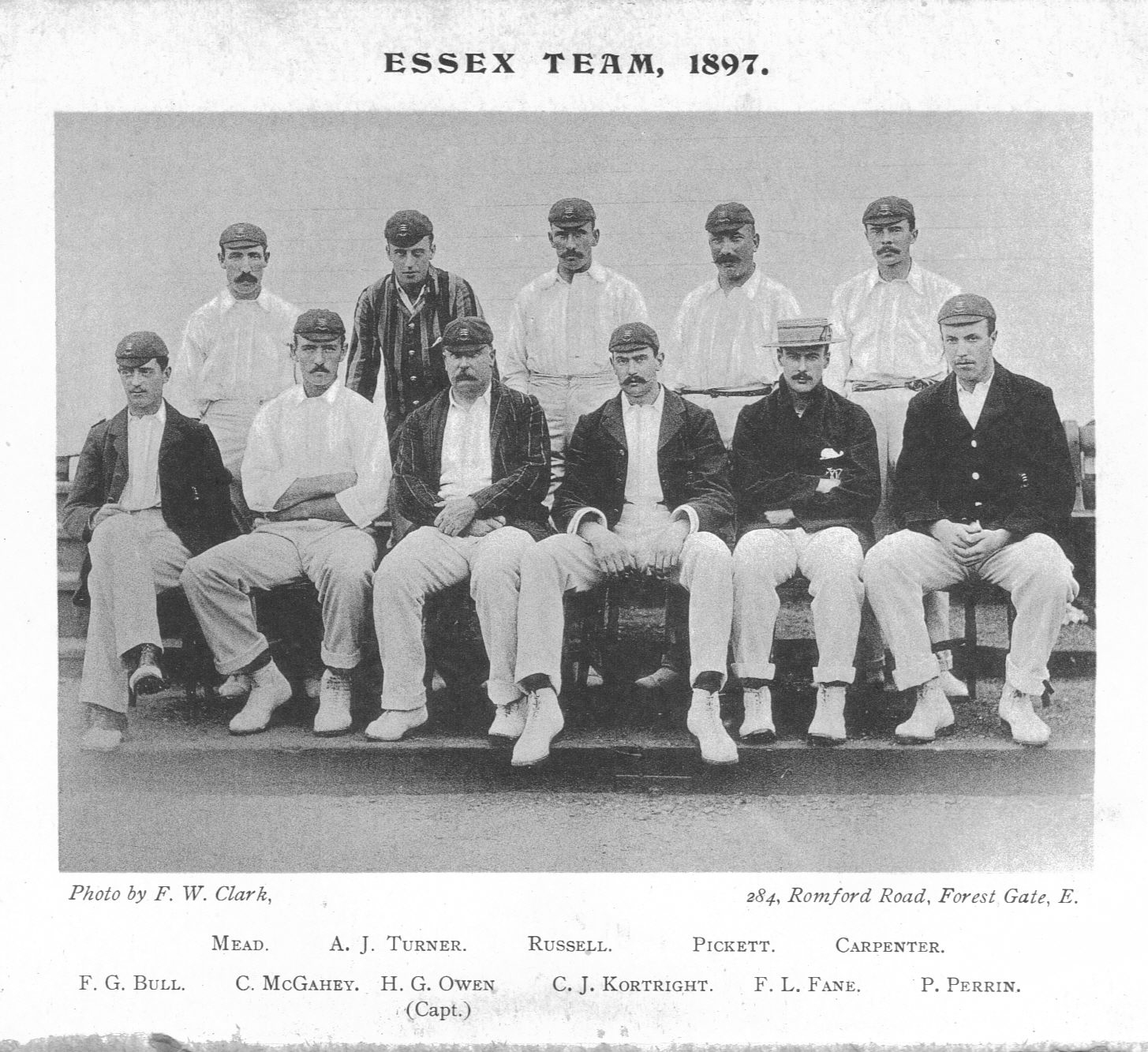
The Essex team in 1897

Essex improved rapidly from 1895, so that by 1897 they were in the running for the Championship, only losing it when Surrey beat them at Leyton. They fell off after this despite beating a fine Australian team on a dubious pitch in 1899, never finishing higher than sixth between 1899 and 1932. Their batting on Leyton's excellent pitches was generally good with the "Essex Twins" of Perrin and McGahey and the sound and skilful Jack Russell, but the bowling depended too much on Mead, Buckenham and later Douglas and when available Louden.

With the decline of these players, Essex fell to some of their lowest levels ever during the late 1920s. Their bowlers conceded over 40 runs a wicket in 1928 – about the highest ever with uncovered pitches. The emergence of Jack O'Connor, Stan Nichols and when available, the amateur fast bowlers Ken Farnes and Hopper Read, though, made Essex during the 1930s a dangerous if inconsistent side. They finished as high as fourth in 1933, and owing to their pace bowling maintained almost as high a standard up to the outbreak of war. The batting, however, tended to depend too much upon O'Connor and a number of amateurs who were rarely available, and Essex lost too many games to break the North's stronghold on the Championship.

After World War II Essex fell off, taking their first wooden spoon in 1950. During this period it was left to Trevor Bailey to do all the pace bowling, and he was often unavailable due to Test calls, whilst spinner Peter Smith was frequently overbowled until he retired in 1951 – thus a strong batting line-up led by Bailey and Doug Insole could seldom win games. Not until 1957 did Essex come back into the top half of the table, but Bailey and Barry Knight never had support of sufficient class to permit them to reach the top of the table, even when Robin Hobbs became England's last successful leg-spinner late in the 1960s.

In the 1970s, with overseas players now permitted, Essex were able to gradually strengthen their team to achieve much more than they ever had before. This decade saw the advent of Graham Gooch, one of England's finest opening batsmen, even though he began his Test career with a pair against Australia in 1975. He didn't return to the England team until 1978, but after a slow start began to assert his dominance over Test bowlers as he had on the county scene. Dedicated to training, he forced his burly physique through a tough regime to prolong his career long after some of his contemporaries had retired.

Along with Gooch, county captain and England batsman Keith Fletcher built a powerful eleven in the late 1970s that dominated domestic cricket from 1979 to 1992, when Essex won six of thirteen County Championship titles. The bowling in the first half of this period was borne by tireless left arm seamer John Lever and spinner and prankster Ray East. The South African Ken McEwan and Fletcher were the best batsmen after Gooch. As Lever declined, England all rounder Derek Pringle and fast bowler Neil Foster took over, whilst John Childs crossed from Gloucestershire to take over as the chief spinner.

In the 1990s, Essex had more internationals, including Nasser Hussain, who captained England in several series. Bowlers Mark Ilott and Peter Such earned caps, as well as wicket keeper James Foster. Ashley Cowan toured the West Indies in 1997/98 without playing an international match. Essex were also able to sign England fast bowlers Darren Gough and Alex Tudor, after they left Yorkshire and Surrey respectively.

Led by all-rounder Ronnie Irani Essex won the National League Division 1 title in 2005, their first major title in eight years.

In 2006, Essex successfully defended their National League title in the newly rebranded Pro40 format by the narrowest of margins, having tied for the title on points. The club missed out on promotion in the County Championship only on the last day of the season, losing to Leicestershire while their rivals Worcestershire beat Northamptonshire. In that season's Twenty20 Cup Essex beat Yorkshire to reach the semi-finals at Trent Bridge, where they were beaten by eventual tournament winners Leicestershire. Essex also had Twenty20 success in the first floodlit Twenty20 Tournament, held between the four teams with permanent floodlights, in a series of 2 legged matches. Essex beat Derbyshire 1–0, after the first leg was washed out, and they won the second leg convincingly.

Essex were promoted back to Division One for the 2010 season. Essex won the County Championship in 2017 and 2019, and won the Bob Willis Trophy in 2020. Essex won the 2019 T20 Blast, beating Worcestershire Rapids in the final. Captain and player of the match Simon Harmer hit the winning runs and took 3–16.

== Essex Eagles ==
Since 1999 the club has fielded limited over sides known as the Essex Eagles. It is commonly held that this identity is – like the Northamptonshire ‘Steelbacks’ – based on the local army regiment. The local Essex Regiment, nicknamed the Pompadours due to their unique Rose Pompadour (maroon) facing colour used an Eagle as one of their emblems due to their capture of a Napoleonic Eagle in the Battle of Salamanca in 1812. However the clubs adoption of the Eagle name was, in part at least, for alliterative reasons.

The Eagle’s side has regularly changed colours, initially wearing predominantly a yellow kit, before later switching to blue and now wearing a mainly red shirt.

== Home grounds ==
The club currently plays all its home games at Chelmsford – Colchester's cricket festival has been suspended since the 2017 season.

- County Cricket Ground, Chelmsford
- Lower Castle Park, Colchester

== Players ==
=== Current squad ===
- No. denotes the player's squad number, as worn on the back of their shirt.
- ‡ denotes players with international caps.
- * denotes a player who has been awarded a county cap.

No.	Name	Nat	Birth date	Batting style	Bowling style	Notes
Batters
21	Tom Westley* ‡	England	13 March 1989 (age 37)	Right-handed	Right-arm off break	
32	Laurie Evans	England	12 October 1987 (age 39)	Right-handed	Right-arm medium	White ball contract
56	Charlie Allison	England	2 March 2005 (age 21)	Right-handed	Right-arm off break	
All-rounders
5	Zaman Akhter	England	12 March 1999 (age 27)	Right-handed	Right-arm fast-medium	
8	Noah Thain	England	13 January 2005 (age 21)	Right-handed	Right-arm fast-medium	
20	Matt Critchley*	England	13 August 1996 (age 30)	Right-handed	Right-arm leg break	
22	Paul Walter*	England	28 May 1994 (age 32)	Left-handed	Left-arm fast-medium	
Wicket-keepers
17	George Bell	England	25 September 2002 (age 24)	Right-handed	—	
19	Michael Pepper*	England	25 June 1998 (age 28)	Right-handed	—	
51	Simon Fernandes	England	22 March 2000 (age 26)	Right-handed	Right-arm off break	
77	Jordan Cox* ‡	England	21 October 2000 (age 26)	Right-handed	Right-arm off break	England central contract
Bowlers
7	Mitchell Killeen	England	29 September 2004 (age 22)	Right-handed	Right-arm fast-medium	
16	Sam Cook* ‡	England	4 August 1997 (age 29)	Right-handed	Right-arm fast-medium	England central contract
29	Shane Snater* ‡	Netherlands	24 March 1996 (age 30)	Right-handed	Right-arm fast-medium	
44	Jamie Porter*	England	25 May 1993 (age 33)	Right-handed	Right-arm fast-medium	
59	Mackenzie Jones ‡	Scotland	6 March 2005 (age 21)	Right-handed	Right-arm fast-medium	
85	Charlie Bennett	England	1 May 2006 (age 20)	Right-handed	Right-arm fast-medium	
Source: Updated: 27 September 2026

=== Essex players with international caps ===
Essex county cricketers who have during their career also represented their national team in Test cricket, One Day International cricket or Twenty20 International cricket.

England

- (England) Ronnie Irani
- (England) Graham Gooch
- (England) Keith Fletcher
- (England) Jack Russell
- (England) Stan Nichols
- (England) Ravi Bopara
- (England) Nasser Hussain
- (England) Alastair Cook
- (England) Barry Knight
- (England) James Foster
- (England) Neil Foster
- (England) Nick Knight
- (England) Darren Gough
- (England) Paul Grayson
- (England) Adam Hollioake
- (England) Mark Ilott
- (England) Alex Tudor
- (England) Jason Gallian
- (England) John Lever
- (England) Walter Mead
- (England) Claude Buckenham
- (England) Jack O'Connor
- (England) Johnny Douglas
- (England) Frederick Fane
- (England) Charlie McGahey
- (England) Paul Gibb
- (England) Mike Denness
- (England) Aftab Habib
- (England) John Stephenson
- (England) Jim Laker
- (England) Derek Pringle
- (England) Martin Saggers
- (England) Peter Such
- (England) Owais Shah
- (England) Sajid Mahmood
- (England) Reece Topley
- (England) Monty Panesar
- (England) Tymal Mills
- (England) Ben Foakes
- (England) Trevor Bailey
- (England) John Childs
- (England) Doug Insole
- (England) Peter Smith
- (England) Ken Farnes
- (England) Neil Williams
- (England) Sailor Young
- (England) Hopper Read
- (England) Tom Westley
- (England) Dan Lawrence
- (England) Robin Hobbs
- (England) Jordan Cox
- (England) Liam Dawson
- (England) Sam Cook

India

- (India) Harbhajan Singh
- (India) Murali Vijay
- (India) Gautam Gambhir
- (India) Khaleel Ahmed

Bangladesh

- (Bangladesh) Tamim Iqbal

Australia

- (Australia) Mark Waugh
- (Australia) Andy Bichel
- (Australia) Bruce Francis
- (Australia) Michael Kasprowicz
- (Australia) Stuart Law
- (Australia) Allan Border
- (Australia) Merv Hughes
- (Australia) Bryce McGain
- (Australia) Rob Quiney
- (Australia) Shaun Tait
- (Australia) Peter Siddle
- (Australia) Adam Zampa
- (Australia) Daniel Sams
- (Australia) Beau Webster

Pakistan

- (Pakistan) Mohammad Akram
- (Pakistan) Mohammad Amir
- (Pakistan) Danish Kaneria
- (Pakistan) Saleem Malik
- (Pakistan) Wahab Riaz
- (Pakistan) Sadiq Mohammad

Netherlands

- (Netherlands) Ryan ten Doeschate
- (Netherlands) Shane Snater

Zimbabwe

- (Zimbabwe) Andy Flower
- (Zimbabwe) Grant Flower

South Africa

- (South Africa) Hashim Amla
- (South Africa) Simon Harmer
- (South Africa) Dean Elgar
- (South Africa) Lee Irvine
- (South Africa) Dale Steyn
- (South Africa) André Nel
- (South Africa) Lonwabo Tsotsobe
- (South Africa) Alviro Petersen
- (South Africa) Charl Willoughby
- (South Africa) Eathan Bosch
- (South Africa) Wiaan Mulder

West Indies

- (Barbados) Keith Boyce
- (Barbados) Bertie Clarke
- (Dominica) Norbert Phillip
- (Trinidad and Tobago) Dwayne Bravo

New Zealand

- (New Zealand) Andre Adams
- (New Zealand) Chris Martin
- (New Zealand) Tim Southee
- (New Zealand) Scott Styris
- (New Zealand) James Franklin
- (New Zealand) Hamish Rutherford
- (New Zealand) Jesse Ryder
- (New Zealand) Neil Wagner
- (New Zealand) Jimmy Neesham
- (New Zealand) Doug Bracewell

Sri Lanka

- (Sri Lanka) Kasun Rajitha

Scotland

- (Scotland) Mackenzie Jones

Ireland

- (Republic of Ireland) Curtis Campher

== Records ==
Most first-class runs for Essex
Qualification – 20,000 runs

Player	Runs
Graham Gooch	30,701
Keith Fletcher	29,434
Peter Perrin	29,172
Jack O'Connor	27,722
Jack Russell	23,606
Gordon Barker	21,893
Trevor Bailey	21,460
Doug Insole	20,113

Most first-class wickets for Essex
Qualification – 1,000 wickets

Player	Wickets
Peter Smith	1,610
Stan Nichols	1,608
Trevor Bailey	1,593
John Lever	1,473
Walter Mead	1,472
Johnny Douglas	1,443
Ray Smith	1,317
Ken Preston	1,155
Ray East	1,010

== Bibliography ==
- Wisden (1895). Pardon, Sydney (ed.). Wisden Cricketers' Almanack (32nd ed.). London: Wisden. OCLC 852046645.
