= William Burley Lockwood =

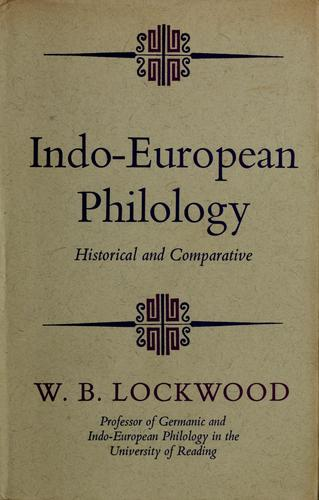
The cover of Indo-European Philology Historical and Comparative, 1969

William Burley Lockwood (13 April 1917 – 30 April 2012) was a Professor of Germanic and Indo-European Philology at the University of Reading from 1968 until his retirement in 1982.

== Biography ==
After leaving school and spending some time working and travelling in England, Germany, Austria and the Balkans, he went to Manchester University and obtained First Class Honours in German in 1942, followed by a DipEd and M.A. at Bristol University, where he received a distinction in practical teaching.

After working briefly in the German Department at Durham University in 1945, Lockwood taught at the University of Birmingham, during which time he also briefly taught as a Senior Lecturer in German at the University of Sydney. As he left Birmingham, the university awarded him a D.Litt. on the basis of his many publications.

In 1961 he received an invitation to the Chair of Comparative Philology at the Humboldt-Universität in East Berlin, the capital of the German Democratic Republic. 1961, however, was the year in which the Communist regime erected its infamous wall, and after four years of increasing disillusionment with the political climate he returned to the West.

He settled in Dublin, intending to devote himself to his philological studies, including German and Germanic languages (especially Faroese) as well as Roman, Hellenic, Slavonic and Celtic (especially Welsh) languages.

A year later, however, he was invited to take up a specially established readership in Germanic and Indo-European philology at Reading. This readership was converted into a chair in 1968, and he remained at Reading until his retirement in 1982.

== Selected publications ==
- The Faroese Bird Names (1961)
- An Informal History of the German Language (1965, 2nd edn. 1976)
- Historical German Syntax (1968)
- Indo-European Philology: Historical and Comparative (1969)
- A Panorama of Indo-European Languages (1972)
- Languages of the British Isles Past and Present (1975)
- An Introduction to Modern Faroese (1977, 4th edn. 2002)
- The Oxford Dictionary of British Bird Names (1984, 2nd edn. 1993)
- German Today: The Advanced Learner's Guide (1987)
- Lehrbuch der modernen jiddischen Sprache (1995)
- An Informal Introduction to English Etymology (1995)
