= 1992 in British television =

This is a list of British television related events from 1992.

== Events ==
=== January ===
- 1 January
  - New Year's Day highlights on BBC1 include the network television premiere of Michael Jackson's 1988 film Moonwalker.
  - New Year's Day highlights on BBC2 include the network television premieres of Radio Days and Australia.
- 2 January – The network television premiere of The Accused on BBC1, a graphic and disturbing film starring Jodie Foster, loosely based on the 1983 Cheryl Araujo case.
- 4 January – BBC2 airs Freddie Mercury: a Tribute, a special programme introduced by Elton John which celebrates the life and work of Freddie Mercury who died on 24 November 1991.
- 7 January
  - Debut of GamesMaster on Channel 4, presented by Dominik Diamond and Patrick Moore.
  - Debut of Cold Blood – The Massacre of East Timor, an edition of the documentary strand First Tuesday on ITV, concerning the Santa Cruz massacre.
  - The children's stop-motion puppet series Joshua Jones, made and produced by Bumper Films, the company behind Fireman Sam makes its debut on BBC1.
- 10 January – Debut of the sitcom Grace & Favour on BBC1, a spin-off of the long-running series Are You Being Served?.
- 12 January – The sitcom As Time Goes By makes its debut on BBC1, starring Judi Dench and Geoffrey Palmer.
- 13 January – The Parliamentary Channel, operated by United Artists Cable and funded by a consortium of British cable operators, is launched.
- 21 January – BBC Select launches on BBC Television as an overnight subscription service, showing specialist programmes for professionals including businessmen, lawyers, teachers and nurses. However, the first series, The Way Ahead, made for the Department of Social Security, is distributed free, on condition that no financial gain is made from it. The subscription service launches shortly after, showing specialist programmes for professionals including businessmen, lawyers, teachers and nurses, although some programmes continue to be shown free-to-air.
- 22 January – The Dreamstone, the children's animated show, returns for a second series on ITV.
- 29 January – ITV shows the 1985 Vampire comedy horror film Fright Night, starring Chris Sarandon and Roddy McDowall.
- 31 January – The Adult Channel launches, a satellite-delivered subscription service featuring cable versions of adult movies and top quality erotic programmes which broadcasts for four hours a day commencing from midnight to 4am.

=== February ===
- 6 February – BBC1 airs the documentary Elizabeth R: A Year in the Life of the Queen to mark the 40th anniversary of the Queen's accession to the throne.
- 8 February – Channel 4 launches TV Heaven, a series of 13 themed Saturday evenings celebrating the best of archive British television. The programme is hosted by Frank Muir with each edition focusing, with one exception on a particular year. The first week's episode takes a look at 1967, featuring classic episodes of Coronation Street, At Last the 1948 Show, Armchair Theatre and The Frost Programme.
- 8–22 February – The BBC provides live and recorded coverage of the 1992 Winter Olympics from France.
- 15 February – The network television premiere of Leonard Nimoy's 1987 comedy film Three Men and a Baby on ITV, starring Tom Selleck, Steve Guttenberg and Ted Danson.
- 18 February – Debut of the sitcom Men Behaving Badly on ITV, later on BBC1, starring Martin Clunes, Neil Morrissey (from series 2), Leslie Ash and Caroline Quentin.
- 19 February – To outcry and scandal, Channel 4 airs an episode of Dispatches entitled "Beyond Belief", claiming to reveal video footage of Satanic ritual abuse. The footage is quickly revealed to be a performance art piece by Psychick TV called "First Transmission".
- 24 February – After a 24 year absence, the game show Take Your Pick is revived on ITV, presented by Des O'Connor.
- 25 February – The children's series Thomas the Tank Engine & Friends is revived on ITV with Michael Angelis taking over as its narrator, replacing Ringo Starr just after two series.
- 27 February – BBC1 airs Cascade, the sixth series finale of Casualty. The episode, featuring a plane crash and originally scheduled to air on 20 December 1991, was postponed because the airdate fell on the eve of the third anniversary of the Lockerbie air disaster.
- February – TV-am closes its in-house news service and contracts out news bulletins to Sky News.

=== March ===
- 2 March – The News at 5.40 is renamed ITN Early Evening News, with John Suchet becoming the main anchor of the programme.
- 4 March – Sky One begins airing the Australian "adult soap" Chances on Wednesdays and Thursdays at 9pm. However, after proving unpopular with viewers, it drops to one episode a week and is shown on Thursdays at 10pm, before ending in early 1993. The series is repeated in a late-night slot in 1995, but on both occasions of its transmission, the final 19 episodes are not shown.
- 6 March – The final episode of Rainbow in its original format is broadcast on ITV, ahead of Thames losing their franchise at the end of the year. The show is rebooted in 1994 by Tetra Films but without any of the presenters.
- 9 March – The Learning Channel, based on the American network of the same name, launches on cable.
- 13 March – BBC One airs the UK network television premiere of Friday the 13th Part VI: Jason Lives.
- 26 March
  - The entertainer and presenter Roy Castle, who presents Record Breakers, announces that he is suffering from lung cancer.
  - The final episode of the long-running children's series You and Me is broadcast on BBC2, although repeats of the show would continue until 1995.
- 27 March – During the 1992 General Election campaign, Conservative MP Edwina Currie pours a glass of orange juice over Labour's Peter Snape shortly after an edition of the Midlands-based debate show Central Weekend has finished airing. Speaking about the incident later, Currie said "I just looked at my orange juice and looked at this man from which this stream of abuse was emanating and thought 'I know how to shut you up.'".
- 28 March
  - Amanda Normansell wins the third series of Stars in Their Eyes, performing as Patsy Cline on ITV, the last to be presented by Leslie Crowther.
  - Channel 4 screens Wes Craven's 1984 horror film A Nightmare on Elm Street, starring Robert Englund as Freddy Krueger.

=== April ===
- 4 April – The final edition of the Saturday morning show Motormouth is broadcast on ITV. The programme ends following the announcement that TVS will lose its ITV franchise at the end of 1992.
- 5 April – The Australian soap E Street makes its UK debut on Sky One with a two-hour pilot, before picking up the series at Episode 43 the following day (the opening episodes having achieved poor ratings in Australia). But due to the violent nature of some of the soap's storylines and its broadcast before the 9pm watershed, some episodes are heavily edited for their UK transmission.
- 6 April – Ahead of the election, Sue Lawley presents an edition of The Granada 500 in which a studio audience are given the opportunity to question the three main party leaders John Major (Conservative), Neil Kinnock (Labour) and Paddy Ashdown (Liberal Democrats).
- 9–10 April – Coverage of the results of the 1992 General Election are broadcast on BBC1, ITV and for the first time on Sky News.
- 10 April – ITV airs the first episode of Heartbeat, the long-running police drama set in North Yorkshire during the 1960s.
- 14 April – The Independent Television Commission issues an invitation to apply for the licence to run a fifth UK television channel.
- 20 April – The Freddie Mercury Tribute Concert for AIDS Awareness, an open-air concert in tribute to the late Freddie Mercury, is held at London's Wembley Stadium. The concert is broadcast on BBC2.
- 24 April – Carlton Television and LWT create a 50/50 joint venture called London News Network to provide both franchisees with news and non-news regional programming.
- 25 April
  - The interactive music video channel The Box goes on the air. It is initially carried by four operators, UA, Telewest in London and Bristol, Nynex in the south of England and Videotron which is also based in London and over the next few years, The Box is rolled out on a regional basis across all of the UK's cable system.
  - Parallel 9 replaces The 8.15 from Manchester as BBC1's Saturday morning Summer magazine programme.
- 30 April – The Independent Television Commission announces that Teletext Ltd will replace ORACLE as the teletext provider for ITV and Channel 4 at the end of the year.

=== May ===
- 2 May – TV Heaven draws to a close after thirteen weeks, with a selection of programmes from 1968 with an episode of Please Sir!, The Cats Eyes Man, an edition of The World of Whicker, an edition of Do Not Adjust Your Set, and The Girl Who Was Death, an episode of The Prisoner.
- 4 May – Wire TV launches. Branding itself as 'The Cable Channel', this is the flagship channel of CPP1. Wire TV broadcasts a mix of entertainment, lifestyle and sport from 1pm until 11pm and includes two hours each day of regional programming.
- 8 May – Liberal Democrat MP and subsequent leader, Charles Kennedy makes his debut appearance as a panellist on the satirical news quiz Have I Got News for You on BBC2.
- 9 May – Ireland's Linda Martin wins the 1992 Eurovision Song Contest (staged in Sweden) with "Why Me?".
- 14 May – Final on-screen appearance of Willy, one of two EastEnders dogs to have appeared in the show since the first episode in 1985 (the other being Roly). Having been killed off in the series, the dog who played Willy dies on 30 May, two weeks after his final scenes are shown.
- 18 May – It is announced that Sky Sports will supply live coverage of football's new Premier League. It will show two live matches a week, on Sunday afternoon and Monday evening. Sky outbid ITV Sport for the rights. The highlights contract is awarded to the BBC, meaning the return of Match of the Day on a weekly basis.
- 22 May – The network television premiere of Ken Russell's 1988 horror comedy The Lair of the White Worm on Channel 4, starring Amanda Donohoe, Hugh Grant, Catherine Oxenberg and Peter Capaldi.
- 24 May – BBC1 airs the Everyman documentary E is for Ecstasy, a film exploring the use of the Ecstasy drug in rave culture.
- 25 May – The network television premiere of Psycho III on BBC1, starring Anthony Perkins.
- 29 May – Sky One cancels its showing of Australian soap opera The Young Doctors at episode 589 due to catching up with some ITV regions.

=== June ===
- 9–10 June – Episodes 1450–1454 of the Australian soap Neighbours are heavily censored by the BBC because they contain an incest storyline between the characters Glen Donnelly, played by Richard Huggett, and Lucy Robinson (Melissa Bell), who had not realised they were half-siblings when they began a relationship. Scenes involving the story are cut from episode 1450, aired on 9 June, while episodes 1451–1454 are edited together into one episode which is transmitted the following day. The scenes are shown uncut in repeats aired by UK Gold in 1998.
- 10–26 June – The BBC and ITV show live coverage of the Euro 92 football championship from Sweden.
- 14 June – An edition of The South Bank Show, The Making of Sgt. Pepper, celebrates the 25th anniversary of the release of The Beatles album Sgt. Pepper's Lonely Hearts Club Band is broadcast on ITV.
- 21 June – ITV airs the first of four editions of Frankie's On..., a series of stand-up shows recorded by the late Frankie Howerd shortly before his death in April. Six episodes had been planned, but only four were recorded before he died. The episodes are Frankie's On Board!, Frankie's On The Coals!, Frankie's On Fire! and Frankie's On Call!.
- 25 June – The British adaptation of the US informational docudrama series Rescue 911, called 999, begins on BBC1, presented by Michael Buerk; it runs for 11 years.
- 26 June – The final lunchtime edition of Business Daily is shown on Channel 4. The breakfast editions. which are part of Channel Four Daily, continue for three more months.
- 27 June – Final edition of ITV football series Saint and Greavsie, the day after the Euro 92 final. The series axe was officially confirmed by the following week as Sky had the new Premier League broadcasting rights from ITV.
- 29 June – Susie Dent makes her debut as lexicographer on the Channel 4 game show Countdown in its 24th series, a role she holds for at least 30 years.
- June – Yorkshire and Tyne Tees Television merge because of the financial strain brought on by the amount of money each paid to keep their ITV franchises. The merger begins a process that will see the consolidation of ITV over the next decade.

=== July ===
- 1 July – The former BSB satellite Marcopolo 2 is sold to Norway's Telenor and renamed Thor 1.
- 3 July
  - Columbia TriStar and Canwest, two backers of the four-strong Channel 5 Holdings Ltd consortium, withdraw their support for the project, leaving Thames Television and Canadian businessman Moses Znaimer to take the project forward. As Channel 5 Holdings are the only current bidders for the Channel 5 licence there are concerns for the future of the process ahead of the deadline, but Channel 5 Holdings says it intends to put forward its bid as planned.
  - After more than seven years on the air, Terry Wogan's thrice-weekly chat show Wogan is broadcast for the final time on BBC1.
- 4 July – The Movie Channel airs the UK network television premiere of Friday the 13th Part V: A New Beginning.
- 6 July – BBC1 launches the ill-fated soap Eldorado, about a group of expatriates living in Spain. Despite much publicity, the series is axed the following year.
- 7 July – Date of the initial deadline for applications to run the Channel 5 service. One application to run the channel is submitted by Channel 5 Holdings Ltd.
- 18–19 July – ITV stages its third and final nationwide Telethon fundraising effort. The 28-hour show attracts criticism from disability campaigners who protest outside London Weekend Television's headquarters, feeling that ITV's charity appeal films for the programme used "pitiful" stereotypes that would not help them to achieve equality.
- 19 July – Vanessa Binns wins the 1992 series of MasterChef on BBC1.
- 25 July−9 August – The BBC becomes the exclusive broadcaster of the Summer Olympic Games in the UK when it shows live coverage of the 1992 Summer Olympics in Barcelona, Spain. Around 15 hours a day of live coverage are broadcast, although Games coverage is interrupted for coverage of other sport, mostly cricket and horse racing, rather than showing non-Olympic sport on BBC2. Eurosport also shows the event and devotes its entire output to the Games.
- July – Newsreader Andrew Gardner retires after 31 years in broadcasting.

=== August ===
- 4 August – ITV airs Katie and Eilish, an edition of the documentary strand First Tuesday about Siamese Twins in Ireland. The film is narrated by Julie Christie, and is a 1993 Peabody Award winner.
- 6 August – Lord Hope, Lord President of the Court of Session, Scotland's most senior judge, allows the televising of appeals in both criminal and civil cases, the first time that cameras have been allowed into courts in the United Kingdom.
- 15 August –
  - The BBC's regaining of rights to top flight football sees the return of Football Focus after a four-year hiatus, and Match of the Day as a weekly programme.
  - Sky Sports launches Sports Saturday. It follows the same format as the BBC's Grandstand programme featuring a mix of sporting action, concluding with the day's football results.
- 16 August – Sky Sports shows its first live Premier League match. The channel launches an afternoon-long football programme called Super Sunday which allows for two hours of pre-match build-up and one hour of post match analysis.
- 17 August – Monday Night Football makes its debut on Sky Sports. This is the first time that domestic football has been shown in the UK on Monday evenings.
- 18 August – Emma Bunton, who would later achieve fame as a member of the Spice Girls, makes her television acting debut in an episode of EastEnders, playing a mugger. She would also make an appearance in The Bill the following year.
- 20 August – Central broadcasts the final episode of the Australian medical soap opera The Young Doctors, making it the first ITV region to complete the series.
- 21 August – The final edition of London Weekend Television's Friday evening magazine programme Six O'Clock Live is broadcast; the series is ending to make way for changes to London's regional news service for ITV that will begin in January 1993.
- 30 August – The network television premiere on BBC1 of Dad, Gary David Goldberg's 1989 comedy drama which is based on William Wharton's novel of the same name, starring Jack Lemmon and Ted Danson.
- 31 August
  - Sky Sports broadcasts live coverage of World Wrestling Federation's SummerSlam '92 held at Wembley Stadium in London, due to the company's growing popularity in the United Kingdom and the possibility of increasing its revenue from the event. It is the first major WWF pay-per-view to take place outside North America.
  - BBC2 spends the evening in TV Hell.

=== September ===
- 1 September
  - Sky Sports becomes a subscription channel.
  - Sky Movies stops showing non-movies programming. It has previously shown selected premium content such as live boxing, music concerts and World Wrestling Federation matches, due to it having been Sky's only encrypted channel and was known as Sky Movies Plus until today, before the launch of the multichannels package.
- 4 September – London Weekend Television launches new idents, sometimes called the 'Flying Blocks' idents.
- 5 September
  - The first edition of ITV's new Saturday morning show What's Up Doc? is broadcast, debuting both Batman: The Animated Series and Taz-Mania during the first programme. The show also alternates with Gimme 5 as ITV's Saturday morning children's show.
  - ITV shows the 1987 science-fiction action movie Predator, as part of a season of films starring Arnold Schwarzenegger.
- 6 September – Channel 4 launches its live coverage of Italian football's Serie A. The first match to be shown is Sampdoria v Lazio. The channel continues to show Italian football for the next ten years until 2002.
- 12 September
  - ITV shows the 1982 John Millius-directed sword-and-sorcery epic Conan the Barbarian, starring Arnold Schwarzenegger.
  - Casualty returns to BBC1 for a seventh series, moving from its previous Friday evening slot to Saturday evenings for its longest ever run of 24 episodes.
  - Channel 4 airs the first edition of its magazine programme Gazzetta Football Italia, presented by James Richardson.
- 14 September – The US animated series originally created for the Fox Children's Network, Peter Pan and the Pirates makes its debut on BBC1.
- 17 September
  - Actress and comedienne Victoria Wood narrates and voices a new animated series for children on BBC1 called Puppydog Tales. The series focuses on four dogs led by the streetwise Rosie in which she tries to teach her naughty friend Ruff some lessons along with jokes, stories and songs that appear at the very end.
  - The children's stop-motion animated series Noddy's Toyland Adventures, based on the original works by Enid Blyton makes its debut on BBC1.
- 19 September – The Times reports that the US media company International Family Entertainment (IFE) has made an offer to buy TVS for £38.2m.
- 23 September – Channel 4 begins a rerun of the cult 1960s science-fiction series The Prisoner, starring Patrick McGoohan as the series marks its 25th anniversary.
- 25 September – Channel 4 airs the final Channel Four Daily. The news-based breakfast television show which launched in 1989 is axed due to poor ratings. It will be replaced the following Monday with the much more popular The Big Breakfast.
- 26 September – ITV concludes a season of films starring Arnold Schwarzenegger with the 1985 film Commando.
- 28 September – The Big Breakfast is launched on Channel 4 at 7am, hosted by Chris Evans and Gaby Roslin; it proves to be a huge hit with viewers with an irreverent and lighter look at current events and entertainment news as well featuring celebrity interviews with Paula Yates. It also sees the UK debut of the comedic Irish puppet duo Zig and Zag. The series will run until 2002.

=== October ===
- 1 October – Sky Movies Gold, a channel dedicated to classic movies, goes on the air. It replaces The Comedy Channel.
- 3 October
  - Comedian and presenter Leslie Crowther sustains serious head injuries after his Rolls-Royce veers out of control and crashes on the M5 near Cheltenham. He subsequently undergoes surgery to remove a blood clot on his brain.
  - The network television premiere on ITV of the James Bond film The Living Daylights, starring Timothy Dalton.
- 5 October – Star Trek: The Next Generation makes its debut on Sky One. The series is initially scheduled to be shown five nights a week from Monday to Friday at 5pm as well as going all the way up to the penultimate episode of the sixth season on 16 August the following year, but prior to that the first run rights in the UK have been on BBC2 to broadcast every episode from "Encounter at Farpoint", the first episode to "The Best of Both Worlds", a two-part special, with the exception of a banned episode which is not shown until 2007.
- 8 October – BBC2 airs the first episode of Later... with Jools Holland. Artists and groups featuring on the inaugural edition are The Neville Brothers, The Christians, Nu Colours and D'Influence.
- 10 October – Gladiators, a British adaptation of the American competition show of the same name, makes its debut on ITV, presented by Ulrika Jonsson and John Fashanu.
- 12 October – Anne Diamond and Nick Owen present a brand new daytime show on BBC1 called Good Morning with Anne and Nick. A potential rival to ITV's This Morning, the series reunites Diamond and Owen who had previously presented together on Good Morning Britain during the 1980s.
- 14 October – The network television premiere of John McTiernan's 1988 action thriller Die Hard on ITV, starring Bruce Willis, Alan Rickman, Bonnie Bedelia, Reginald VelJohnson and Paul Gleason.
- 20 October – Channel 4 airs Burning Books on Sex, a programme reviewing Madonna's book Sex which is published the following day. On the following day, the channel airs Ross Meets Madonna, in which Jonathan Ross talks to the singer.
- 21 October – The US soap Melrose Place makes its UK debut on Sky One.
- 24 October – The fictional character Mr Blobby makes his debut in the 'Gotcha' segment of Noel's House Party on BBC1.
- 29 October – The video game magazine show Bad Influence! makes its debut on ITV, hosted by Andy Crane and Violet Berlin.
- 31 October – Halloween:
  - BBC1's controversial one-off drama Ghostwatch is broadcast, starring Michael Parkinson and Sarah Greene. The pseudo-documentary drama sees a BBC crew's 'live' investigation into a haunted North London house. The programme receives a record number of complaints and tabloid newspapers run extensive coverage following the suicide of one disturbed viewer.
  - BBC2 airs The Vault of Horror, an all-night marathon from 11pm until 7.30am, featuring the films Creepshow, The Curse of the Werewolf, The Bride of Frankenstein, Death Line and Abbott and Costello Meet Frankenstein.

=== November ===
- 1 November – UK Gold is launched. It is a joint venture between the BBC and Thames and shows programmes from the archives of both broadcasters; the channel later focuses on comedy programmes.
- 2 November – Channel 4 celebrates ten years on the air; also on this day, the "Fourscore" theme used in the idents is replaced.
- 3 November – An article in Variety magazine indicates that a number of US companies are interested in acquiring TVS, including TCW Capital, International Family Entertainment Inc. (IFE) and Lorne Michaels. TCW Capital subsequently goes on to make an offer to rival IFE, but pulls out a few weeks later after reviewing the TVS accounts.
- 9 November – ITV's News at Ten is given its first major relaunch, in part to address the criticism it has attracted over the last few years. In a bid to regain the personal touch that it is felt has been lost, the programme dispenses with the dual-presentation team in favour of a sole newscaster, Trevor McDonald who subsequently becomes one of the most well-known newscasters in the UK. Julia Somerville, John Suchet and Dermot Murnaghan each present News at Ten when he is absent. The bulletin continues with this format until 5 March 1999 when it is axed.
- 12 November
  - BBC1 airs the 1,500th edition of Top of the Pops. Presented by Mark Franklin, the show features performances from Charles & Eddie, Michael Bolton, Vanessa Paradis and Boyz II Men.
  - The first episode of Absolutely Fabulous, the hugely popular sitcom written by and starring Jennifer Saunders, is broadcast on BBC2 with subsequent series airing on BBC1. The series also stars Joanna Lumley, Julia Sawalha, Jane Horrocks and June Whitfield.
- 15 November – BBC One airs the UK network television premiere of Friday the 13th Part VIII: Jason Takes Manhattan.
- 20 November – Bob Mills presents a late-night programme on ITV set in his home called In Bed with Medinner in which he specialises in a cynical view of life and its everyday objects and in pastiches of popular culture icons.
- 26 November – The Times reports that IFE have increased their offer to purchase TVS to £45.3 million.
- 28 November
  - ITV shows the network television premiere of Robert Zemeckis's 1988 live-action animation comedy film Who Framed Roger Rabbit, starring Bob Hoskins.
  - BBC1 shows the network television premiere of the 1990 monster comedy film Tremors, starring Kevin Bacon and Fred Ward.
  - Channel 4 shows U2's acclaimed live concert tour Zoo TV.
- 29 November – Sky One airs an unseen third season's episode of Star Trek: The Next Generation. It is not shown on BBC2 until 29 September 2007, due to references to the reunification of Ireland being achieved through terrorism in Northern Ireland between the Provisional Irish Republican Army and the Troubles.
- 30 November
  - To mark the 53rd European Council meeting, held in Edinburgh on 11–12 December, BBC1 Scotland begins a week of programming dedicated to Europe, including comedy, sport, documentaries and political programmes. Reporting Scotland also carries a week of reports about Britain's relationship with Europe.
  - After 37 years on the air, the final edition of the long-running children's series The Sooty Show is broadcast on ITV with the episode Fanatical Fun, one month before its maker Thames goes off the air, although it will be relaunched in September of the following year with the Granada-produced Sooty & Co..

=== December ===
- 3 December
  - Noddy's Toyland Adventures begins airing in Namibia on NBC.
  - BBC2 airs The Truth About Sex, a Horizon special which reveals the first results from the national survey as the largest study of human sexual behaviour dealing explicitly with matters as well as the science of sexology and eroticism, including interviews of veteran researchers William Masters and Virginia Johnson.
- 5 December – The network television premiere of Ted Kotcheff's 1989 black comedy Weekend at Bernie's on BBC1, starring Andrew McCarthy and Jonathan Silverman.
- 6 December – Debut of the long-running police detective series A Touch of Frost on ITV, starring David Jason.
- 7 December – Thomas the Tank Engine & Friends starts airing in Malaysia in its original UK format on TV3, replacing Art Attack.
- 11 December – The Times reports that IFE's bid to buy TVS has been blocked on technical grounds by Julian Tregar, amid concerns that the offer is too low.
- 17 December – Ahead of the loss of its franchise, the final edition of the Thames-produced current affairs series This Week is broadcast.
- 18 December – After 30 years on the air, Police 5 is broadcast on ITV for the final time. It has been broadcast on TVS and ends ahead of them losing their broadcasting franchise and after negotiations with the next franchise holder, Meridian, it has been decided that they would not continue with the programme.
- 20 December – Beatrix Potter's children's stories are shown in the animated series The World of Peter Rabbit and Friends which makes its debut on BBC1.
- 22 December – The network television premiere of 1986 American war drama Heartbreak Ridge on ITV, starring Clint Eastwood, Marsha Mason, Everett McGill, Moses Gunn and Mario Van Peebles.
- 23 December
  - The Queen's Royal Christmas Message is leaked in The Sun newspaper, 48 hours ahead of its traditional Christmas Day broadcast.
  - Thames broadcasts its final full-length edition of Thames News.
- 25 December
  - Christmas Day highlights on BBC1 include the network television premieres of Steven Spielberg's 1989 adventure film sequel Indiana Jones and the Last Crusade, starring Harrison Ford and Sean Connery as well as the comedy Shirley Valentine, starring Pauline Collins.
  - BBC2's Christmas Day schedule includes highlights of The Freddie Mercury Tribute Concert that was held in April.
  - Christmas Day highlights on ITV include the network television premieres of Three Fugitives starring Nick Nolte and Martin Short and Youngblood starring Rob Lowe and Patrick Swayze. There is also a Christmas edition of Blind Date.
- 26 December – The network television premiere of Rob Reiner's 1989 romantic comedy When Harry Met Sally on BBC1, starring Billy Crystal and Meg Ryan.
- 27 December – Joan Hickson makes her final appearance as Miss Marple in the BBC1 TV series with a feature-length adaptation of The Mirror Crack'd from Side to Side.
- 28 December
  - As part of a theme night devoted to rival broadcaster Granada, BBC2 airs the first new edition of University Challenge in five years. The show returns for a full series two years later, presented by Jeremy Paxman.
  - ITV broadcasts the 1000th episode of Home and Away.
- 29 December – The network television premiere of Michael Apted's 1988 biographical drama Gorillas in the Mist on BBC1, starring Sigourney Weaver as the American primatologist and conversationist Dian Fossey.
- 30 December – BBC2 airs Unplugged – Eric Clapton, in which he plays acoustic versions of some of his tracks.
- 31 December
  - After losing its broadcasting franchise in the previous year's franchise round, Thames goes off the air after 24 years. TVS, TSW, breakfast television service TV-am and teletext service ORACLE also go off the air after losing their franchises.
  - Channel 4's testcard ETP-1 is shown for the final time.
  - Sky stops broadcasting via the Marcopolo satellite.
- December – The ITC rejects the Channel 5 Holdings Ltd bid to run the UK's fifth television channel, amid concerns about its business plan and investor commitment to the project.

=== Unknown ===
- John Birt is appointed to succeed Sir Michael Checkland as Director-General of the BBC.
- Sir Michael Bishop succeeds Sir Richard Attenborough as Chairman of Channel 4.

== Debuts ==
=== BBC1 ===
- 3 January – Love Hurts (1992–1994)
- 4 January – Moon and Son (1992)
- 6 January – Goodbye Cruel World (1992)
- 7 January – Joshua Jones (1992)
- 8 January
  - Archer's Goon (1992)
  - Bucky O'Hare and the Toad Wars (1991)
  - Fiddley Foodle Bird (1992)
- 10 January
  - Grace & Favour (1992–1993)
  - Hangar 17 (1992–1994)
- 12 January – As Time Goes By (1992–2005)
- 26 January – A Time to Dance (1992)
- 18 February – Rides (1992–1993)
- 19 February – A Likely Lad (1992)
- 23 February – So Haunt Me (1992–1994)
- 24 February – Mulberry (1992–1993)
- 27 February – Us Girls (1992–1993)
- 15 March – Screaming (1992)
- 16 March – The Old Devils (1992)
- 31 March – Resnick (1992)
- 7 April – The Pirates of Dark Water (1991–1993)
- 19 April
  - Favorite Songs (1990–1992)
  - Steven Spielberg's Amazing Stories (1985–1987)
- 20 April – Thacker (1992)
- 24 April – The Torch (1992)
- 25 April – Parallel 9 (1992–1994)
- 26 April – Don't Tell Father (1992)
- 27 April – Side by Side (1992–1993)
- 3 May – Strathblair (1992–1993)
- 10 May – The Barbara Vine Mysteries (1992–1993)
- 15 May – Friday on My Mind (1992)
- 16 May – Growing Pains (1992–1993)
- 31 May – Natural Lies (1992)
- 24 June – CIA (1992) (documentary)
- 25 June – 999 (1992–2003)
- 6 July – Eldorado (1992–1993)
- 23 July – Night of the Red Hunter (1989)
- 24 July – Virtual Murder (1992)
- 4 September – Between the Lines (1992–1994)
- 6 September – A Very Polish Practice (1992)
- 14 September – Peter Pan and the Pirates (1990–1991)
- 17 September
  - Noddy's Toyland Adventures (1992–1999)
  - Puppydog Tales (1992)
- 18 September
  - Christopher Crocodile (1992)
  - The Chipmunks Go to the Movies (1990)
- 22 September – Civvies (1992)
- 26 September – Run the Risk (1992–1996)
- 29 September
  - Spacevets (1992–1994)
  - Funnybones (1992)
- 12 October – Good Morning with Anne and Nick (1992–1996)
- 21 October – Pole to Pole (1992)
- 26 October – Get Back (1992–1993)
- 31 October – Ghostwatch (1992)
- 1 November – Tell Tale Hearts (1992)
- 19 November – Sitting Pretty (1992–1993)
- 22 November – Look at It This Way (1992)
- 20 December – The World of Peter Rabbit and Friends (1992–1995)
- 25 December – Juniper Jungle (1992–1993)

=== BBC2 ===
- 6 January – The Pall Bearer's Revue (1992)
- 14 February – Witchcraft (1992)
- 17 February – Underbelly (1992)
- 22 April – Mr. Wakefield's Crusade (1992)
- 11 June – Pandora's Box (1992)
- 23 September – Ghostwriter (1992–1995)
- 7 October – Downtown Lagos (1992)
- 8 October – Later... with Jools Holland (1992–present)
- 28 October – The Secret Agent (1992)
- 8 November – The Borrowers (1992)
- 12 November – Absolutely Fabulous (1992–1996, 2001–2004, 2011–2012)
- 18 November – Nice Town (1992)
- 7 December – Unnatural Pursuits (1992)
- 29 December – The Vampyr: A Soap Opera (1992)

=== ITV ===
- 3 January – The Good Guys (1992–1993)
- 9 January – Runaway Bay (1992–1993)
- 10 January – Truckers (1992)
- 25 January – The Cloning of Joanna May (1992)
- 9 February – Maigret (1992–1993)
- 16 February – The Old Boy Network (1992)
- 18 February
  - Men Behaving Badly (1992–1998)
  - Just Us (1992–1994)
- 22 February – The Brian Conley Show (1992–2002)
- 28 February – Growing Rich (1992)
- 9 March – Junglies (1992–1993)
- 10 March – Extraordinary People (1992–1993)
- 10 April – Heartbeat (1992–2010)
- 17 April – White Bear's Secret (1992)
- 24 April
  - The Gingerbread Man (1992)
  - My Friend Walter (1992)
- 25 April – Gimme 5 (1992–1994)
- 8 May – Wilderness Edge (1992)
- 12 May – Anglo-Saxon Attitudes (1992)
- 17 May – Root Into Europe (1992)
- 8 June – The Guilty (1992)
- 24 June – Land of Hope and Gloria (1992)
- 27 June – Sam Saturday (1992)
- 16 June – Firm Friends (1992)
- 26 July – TV Squash (1992)
- 30 July – Me, You and Him (1992)
- 31 August – Covington Cross (1992)
- 5 September – What's Up Doc? (1992–1995)
- 5 September – Batman: The Animated Series (1992–1995)
- 11 September – Astro Farm (1992–1996)
- 1 October – G.P. (1989–1996)
- 3 October – WYSIWYG (1992–1993)
- 10 October – Gladiators (1992–2000, 2008–2009)
- 29 October – Bad Influence! (1992–1996)
- 9 November – The Life and Times of Henry Pratt (1992)
- 13 November – Gone to Seed (1992)
- 16 November – Brill (1992–1996)
- 20 November – In Bed with Medinner (1992–1999)
- 22 November – The Secret Life of Arnold Bax (1992)
- 27 November – Framed (1992)
- 6 December – A Touch of Frost (1992–2010)
- 7 December – The Blackheath Poisonings (1992)
- Unknown – Doug (1991–1994)

=== Channel 4 ===
- 7 January – GamesMaster (1992–1998)
- 18 January – Little Rosey (1990)
- 13 January – The Falklands War (1992) (documentary series)
- 8 February – TV Heaven (1992)
- 16 February – Northern Exposure (1990–1995)
- 5 March
  - The Camomile Lawn (1992)
  - The Big One (1992)
- 15 March – Pugwall (1989–1991)
- 15 April – Sean's Show (1992–1993)
- 17 April – Tooth Fairy, Where Are You? (1991)
- 8 May – The Music Game (1992–1993)
- 10 June – Blue Heaven (1992)
- 4 July – ProStars (1991)
- 5 July – Take 5 (1992–1996)
- 6 September – Football Italia (1992–2002 Channel 4, 2002–2005 British Eurosport, 2005–2006 Bravo, 2007–2008 Five)
- 11 September – Terry and Julian (1992)
- 28 September – The Big Breakfast (1992–2002)
- 3 October – Sandokan (1992)
- 19 November – The Big Battalions (1992)
- Unknown – Gummed Labels (1992)

=== Sky One ===
- 4 March – Chances (1991–1992)
- 9 March – Studs (1991–1993)
- 5 April – E Street (1989–1993)
- 8 May – The Flash (1990–1991, 2014–present)
- 3 October – Knights and Warriors (1992–1993)
- 6 October
  - Teech (1991)
  - Anything but Love (1989–1992)
  - Gabriel's Fire (1990–1991)
- 21 October – Melrose Place (1992–1999, 2009–2010)
- Unknown
  - The Red Green Show (1991–2006)
  - Seinfeld (1989–1998)

=== Sky Sports ===
- 15 August – Sports Saturday (1992–1998)
- 16 August – Super Sunday (1992–present)
- 17 August – Monday Night Football (1992–2007, 2010–present)

=== MTV Europe ===
- 14 April – MTV's Most Wanted (1992–1995)

== Channels ==
=== New channels ===
Date	Channel
13 January	The Parliamentary Channel
31 January	The Adult Channel
9 March	The Learning Channel
25 April	The Box
4 May	Wire TV
1 October	Sky Movies Gold
October	CMT Europe
1 November	UK Gold
December	Performance Channel

=== Defunct channels ===
Date	Channel
30 September	The Comedy Channel
31 December	Sky Arts

== Television shows ==
=== Changes of network affiliation ===
Shows	Moved from	Moved to
The Magic Roundabout	BBC1	Channel 4
Paddington	BBC1	Channel 4
The Wombles	BBC1	Channel 4
The Herbs	BBC1	Channel 4
Star Trek: The Next Generation	BBC2	Sky One
Rescue 911	ITV	Sky One
University Challenge	ITV	BBC2
Stingray	ITV	BBC2
The Dreamstone	ITV	The Children's Channel

=== Returning this year after a break of one year or longer ===
- Take Your Pick (1955–1968, 1992–1998)
- The Tomorrow People (1973–1979, 1992–1995)
- Nightingales (1990, 1992–1993)

== Continuing television shows ==
=== 1920s ===
- BBC Wimbledon (1927–1939, 1945–2019, 2021–present)

=== 1930s ===
- Trooping the Colour (1937–1939, 1945–2019, 2023–present)
- The Boat Race (1938–1939, 1945–2019, 2021–present)
- BBC Cricket (1939, 1945–1999, 2020–2024)

=== 1940s ===
- Come Dancing (1949–1998)

=== 1950s ===
- Panorama (1953–present)
- What the Papers Say (1956–2008)
- The Sky at Night (1957–present)
- Blue Peter (1958–present)
- Grandstand (1958–2007)

=== 1960s ===
- Coronation Street (1960–present)
- Songs of Praise (1961–present)
- World in Action (1963–1998)
- Top of the Pops (1964–2006)
- Match of the Day (1964–present)
- Mr. and Mrs. (1965–1999)
- Jackanory (1965–1996, 2006)
- Sportsnight (1965–1997)
- Call My Bluff (1965–2005)
- The Money Programme (1966–2010)

=== 1970s ===
- Emmerdale (1972–present)
- Newsround (1972–present)
- Pebble Mill (1972–1986, 1991–1996)
- Last of the Summer Wine (1973–2010)
- That's Life! (1973–1994)
- Wish You Were Here...? (1974–2003)
- Arena (1975–present)
- Jim'll Fix It (1975–1994)
- One Man and His Dog (1976–present)
- Grange Hill (1978–2008)
- Ski Sunday (1978–present)
- The Paul Daniels Magic Show (1979–1994)
- Antiques Roadshow (1979–present)
- Question Time (1979–present)

=== 1980s ===
- Family Fortunes (1980–2002, 2006–2015, 2020–present)
- Children in Need (1980–present)
- Danger Mouse (1981–1992, 2015–2019)
- Timewatch (1982–present)
- Brookside (1982–2003)
- Countdown (1982–present)
- Right to Reply (1982–2001)
- First Tuesday (1983–1993)
- Highway (1983–1993)
- Blockbusters (1983–93, 1994–95, 1997, 2000–01, 2012, 2019)
- Spitting Image (1984–1996)
- Surprise Surprise (1984–2001, 2012–2015)
- The Bill (1984–2010)
- Channel 4 Racing (1984–2016)
- Thomas the Tank Engine & Friends (1984–present)
- Busman's Holiday (1985–1993)
- EastEnders (1985–present)
- Crosswits (1985–1998)
- Screen Two (1985–1998)
- Telly Addicts (1985–1998)
- Blind Date (1985–2003, 2017–2019)
- Comic Relief (1985–present)
- ScreenPlay (1986–1993)
- Beadle's About (1986–1996)
- The Chart Show (1986–1998, 2008–2009)
- Equinox (1986–2006)
- The Really Wild Show (1986–2006)
- Casualty (1986–present)
- Every Second Counts (1986–1993)
- Lovejoy (1986–1994)
- The Raggy Dolls (1986–1994)
- Allsorts (1987–1995)
- Going Live! (1987–1993)
- Watching (1987–1993)
- The New Statesman (1987–1994)
- Going for Gold (1987–1996, 2008–2009)
- The Time, The Place (1987–1998)
- The Cook Report (1987–1999)
- Inspector Morse (1987–2000)
- Chain Letters (1987–1997)
- ChuckleVision (1987–2009)
- Count Duckula (1988–1993)
- You Rang, M'Lord? (1988–1993)
- You Bet! (1988–1997)
- Playdays (1988–1997)
- Wheel of Fortune (1988–2001)
- London's Burning (1988–2002)
- On the Record (1988–2002)
- Fifteen to One (1988–2003, 2013–2019)
- This Morning (1988–present)
- Fun House (1989–1999)
- Absolutely (1989–1993)
- KYTV (1989–1993)
- Press Gang (1989–1993)
- Birds of a Feather (1989–1998, 2014–2020)
- A Bit of Fry & Laurie (1989–1995)
- Byker Grove (1989–2006)
- Desmond's (1989–1994)
- Bodger & Badger (1989–1999)
- Children's Ward (1989–2000)
- Mike and Angelo (1989–2000)

=== 1990s ===
- The $64,000 Question (1990–1993)
- Families (1990–1993)
- Jeeves and Wooster (1990–1993)
- Waiting for God (1990–1994)
- Mr. Bean (1990–1995)
- The Crystal Maze (1990–1995, 2016–2020)
- Keeping Up Appearances (1990–1995)
- Turnabout (1990–1996)
- The Upper Hand (1990–1996)
- Drop the Dead Donkey (1990–1998)
- One Foot in the Grave (1990–2000)
- MasterChef (1990–2001, 2005–present)
- How 2 (1990–2006)
- Stars in Their Eyes (1990–2006, 2015)
- The Dreamstone (1990–1995)
- Rosie and Jim (1990–2000)
- Big Break (1991–2002)
- The Darling Buds of May (1991–1993)
- Spender (1991–1993)
- The House of Eliott (1991–1994)
- The Brittas Empire (1991–1997)
- Bottom (1991–1995)
- Soldier Soldier (1991–1997)
- Noel's House Party (1991–1999)
- 2point4 Children (1991–1999)
- Darkwing Duck (1991–1992)
- Little Dracula (1991–1999)
- Where's Wally?: The Animated Series (1991)

== Ending this year ==
- 2 January – Canned Carrott (1990–1992)
- 10 February – No Job for a Lady (1990–1992)
- 19 February
  - Van der Valk (1972–1973, 1977, 1991–1992)
  - The Secret Cabaret (1990–1992)
- 2 March – El C.I.D. (1990–1992)
- 19 March – Danger Mouse (1981–1992, 2015–2019)
- 31 March – Joshua Jones (1992)
- 1 April – Fiddley Foodle Bird (1992)
- 3 April
  - In Sickness and in Health (1985–1992)
  - Truckers (1992)
- 4 April – Motormouth (1988–1992)
- 6 April – The Mary Whitehouse Experience (1990–1992)
- 10 April – Spatz (1990–1992)
- 14 April – DuckTales (1987–1990)
- 26 April – The Big Match (1968–1992)
- 10 May – The Piglet Files (1990–1992)
- 11 May – Wail of the Banshee (1992)
- 30 May – Wayne Dobson – A Kind of Magic (1990–1992)
- 3 July – Wogan (1982–1992)
- 29 July – Hope It Rains (1991–1992)
- 17 August – Kick Start (1979–1992)
- 24 August – After Henry (1988–1992)
- 1 September – Shelley (1979–1984, 1988–1992)
- 6 September – A Very Peculiar Practice (1986–1992)
- 25 September
  - The Channel Four Daily (1989–1992)
  - Business Daily (1987–1992)
- 28 September – Playbox (1987–1992)
- 16 October – Terry and Julian (1992)
- 17 November – T-Bag (1985–1992)
- 30 November – The Sooty Show (1955–1992)
- 1 December – Boon (1986–1992, 1995)
- 3 December – Rumpole of the Bailey (1975–1992)
- 5 December – The Hit Man and Her (1988–1992)
- 11 December – Christopher Crocodile (1992)
- 16 December – Family Pride (1991–1992)
- 17 December – This Week (1956–1978, 1986–1992)
- 18 December
  - After Nine (1985–1992)
  - Puppydog Tales (1992)
  - Police 5 (1962–1992, 2014)
- 23 December
  - Dooby Duck's Disco Bus (1989–1992)
  - Watt on Earth (1991–1992)
- 30 December – 'Allo 'Allo! (1982–1992)
- 31 December
  - Good Morning Britain (1983–1992)
  - Wide Awake Club (1984–1992)
  - Park Avenue (1988–1992)
- Up Pompeii! (1969–1975, 1991–1992)
- James the Cat (1984–1992, 1998–2003)
- Pigsty (1990–1992)

== Births ==
- 14 February – Freddie Highmore, actor
- 17 March – Eliza Bennett, actress and singer
- 14 May – Laya Lewis, actress
- 4 June – Brooke Vincent, actress
- 31 August – Holly Earl, actress
- 2 November – Naomi Ackie, actress
- 3 December – Joseph McManners, actor
- 17 December – Thomas Law, actor
- 22 December – Chris Hughes, television personality
- 24 December – Melissa Suffield, actress

== Deaths ==
Date	Name	Age	Cinematic Credibility
11 January	W. G. Hoskins	83	historian and television presenter (Landscapes of England)
25 February	Guy Deghy	79	actor (The Saint)
18 April	H. V. Kershaw	74	scriptwriter (Coronation Street)
19 April	Frankie Howerd	75	comedian and actor (That Was The Week That Was, Up Pompeii!, The Blunders)
20 April	Benny Hill	68	comedian (The Benny Hill Show)
21 April	Nigel Williams	47	conservator and television presenter
19 May	James Bate	47	actor (Sleuth, The Spoils of War)
24 May	Joan Sanderson	79	actress (Please Sir!, Fawlty Towers, Me and My Girl)
3 June	Robert Morley	84	actor (Those Magnificent Men in their Flying Machines, Who Is Killing the Great Chefs of Europe?, British Airways advertisements).
5 June	Laurence Naismith	83	actor (The Persuaders!)
5 July	Georgia Brown	58	actress (Shoulder to Shoulder)
23 July	Maxine Audley	69	actress (Danger Man, Edgar Wallace Mysteries, The Adventures of Black Beauty)
29 August	Teddy Turner	75	actor (Never the Twain, Emmerdale)
2 September	Johnnie Mortimer	61	scriptwriter (Man About the House, George & Mildred, Robin's Nest, Never the Twain)
5 September	Christopher Trace	59	television presenter (Blue Peter)
6 September	Mervyn Johns	93	actor (Dixon of Dock Green, Crown Court, Shoestring)
6 October	Denholm Elliott	70	actor (Follow the Yellow Brick Road, Brimstone and Treacle, Blade on the Feather)
5 December	Hilary Tindall	54	actress (Randall and Hopkirk (Deceased), Emergency Ward 10, The Brothers, The Fall and Rise of Reginald Perrin, Z-Cars)
6 December	Percy Herbert	62	actor (Danger Man, The Saint, Z-Cars, Dixon of Dock Green, Worzel Gummidge)
11 December	Michael Robbins	62	actor (On the Buses)
22 December	Ted Willis	78	scriptwriter (Dixon of Dock Green)

== See also ==
- 1992 in British music
- 1992 in British radio
- 1992 in the United Kingdom
- List of British films of 1992
