= 1992 in British radio =

This is a list of events in British radio during 1992.

== Events ==
=== January ===
- 6 January –
  - Brian Hayes takes over The Radio 2 Breakfast Show from Derek Jameson.
  - The first edition of The AM Alternative is broadcast on BBC Radio 5. The new programme, presented by Johnnie Walker, is on air every weekday and replaces the three separate shows – This Family Edition, Sound Advice and The Health Show – which had previously occupied the mid-morning slot.
  - BBC Radio 2 launches the Radio 2 Top 20 Easy Listening Album Chart, broadcast each Monday during Ed Stewart’s show.

=== February ===
- 9 February – The final edition of the Bruno and Liz Breakfast Show is broadcast on BBC Radio 1.
- 11 February – Airport Information Radio closes. The station had provided a travel news service for people using Heathrow and Gatwick airports since 1990.
  - 15 February-8 March – Johnnie Walker hosts Radio 1's Weekend Breakfast Show for four weekends.
- 15 February – Radio Orwell changes its name to SGR FM following the purchase of the station by East Anglian Radio.
- 17 February – Danny Baker replaces Sarah Ward and Jon Briggs as presenter of Radio 5's weekday breakfast programme Morning Edition.
- 21 February – Ahead of a schedule revamp, Gary Davies presents his final 'bit in the middle' on BBC Radio 1. He had presented the weekday lunchtime show for the station since 1984. He is replaced on 24 February by Jakki Brambles. The new schedule sees Gary moving to the weekends, including presenting the weekend breakfast show.
- 29 February – BBC Radio 3 stops broadcasting on MW. Its frequency is to be used by a national commercial station.

=== March ===
- 1 March –
  - Commercial radio comes to Lincolnshire, with the launch of Lincs FM.
  - Mark Goodier ends his first stint as presenter of BBC Radio 1's Complete UK Top 40.
- 6 March – Round Table is broadcast on BBC Radio 1 for the final time.
- 8 March – Tommy Vance presents this edition of Radio 1's Top 40 programme. This is the final time that the Radio 1 chart show runs for 2 and a half hours.
- 9 March – BBC Radio 1 undergoes a schedule revamp, with most of the changes being to the weekend schedule, and a new jingles package is introduced based on the theme Closer to the Music.
- 15 March –
  - Chris Evans makes his BBC Radio 1 debut, presenting a short-lived Sunday early afternoon show called Too Much Gravy.
  - Bruno Brookes returns as host of BBC Radio 1’s Complete UK Top 40. The programme is extended once again and now airs from 4 pm until 7 pm.
- 23 March – BBC Radio Nottingham ends transmissions on one of its MW transmitters. BBC Radio Cleveland also stops broadcasting on MW at around the same time.
- Late March–7 April – Radio 4 long wave opts out of the main Radio 4 schedule to provide additional coverage of the latest developments in the general election campaign. Called Campaign Report, the coverage runs for around four hours each weekday, as three separate programmes airing mid-morning, early afternoon and early evening.

=== April ===
- 3 April – Commercial radio comes to Cornwall, with the launch of Pirate FM.
- 20 April – The Freddie Mercury Tribute Concert for AIDS Awareness, an open-air concert in tribute to the late Freddie Mercury is held at London's Wembley Stadium. The concert is broadcast on BBC2 and BBC Radio 1 in the UK, and televised worldwide.
- Undated in April – The Radio Authority awards the second Independent National Radio licence to Independent Music Radio, a consortium jointly owned by TV-am and Virgin Communications Ltd. The Authority had hoped that the station would launch by the end of the year but it would be the following April before it went on air.

=== May ===
- 20 May – Ball-by-ball cricket commentary moves to BBC Radio 3's FM frequencies for the summer following the switching-off of BBC Radio 3's MW frequency.

=== June ===
- 10–26 June – For the first time, the BBC provides full radio coverage of an international football tournament when it broadcasts live commentary of every game of Euro 92 on BBC Radio 5.
- 22 June – Radio Wimbledon broadcasts for the first time, providing coverage of the Wimbledon tennis championships. The service broadcasts as a restricted service licence and is available within a 5-mile radius of the AELTC.
- 28 June – BBC Radio 2 provides fifteen hours of coverage of the first annual National Music Day, presented by Ken Bruce.

=== July ===
- 4 July – Commercial radio comes to North Yorkshire, with the launch of Minster FM.
- 13 July – In a bid to counter-act the forthcoming launch of Classic FM, BBC Radio 3 makes major changes to its programmes, including the launch of new weekday breakfast and drivetime programmes. On Air replaces the weekday editions of Morning Concert and In Tune replaces Mainly for Pleasure.
- 14 July – The BBC announces plans for a new 24-hour radio news station. It would be on air by January 1994 at the latest and would broadcast on long wave.
- 17 July – As part of the Radio 3 changes, a new three-hour Sunday morning show of popular classics launches, introduced by Brian Kay.
- 25 July – BBC Radio 4 stops the week for the final time, after having done so since 1974.
- 26 July – 9 August – Radio 5 provides full live coverage of the 1992 Summer Olympic Games. Programmes run all day, from 6.30 am until 10 pm. This is the first time that BBC Radio has provided full coverage of the Games.
- Undated in July – As Classic FM prepares to launch, test transmissions are carried out using a recording of birdsong originally made for a Raymond Briggs play about nuclear war in 1991. The recording proves popular with listeners and from 2003 to 2005 and again from 2008 until 2009 the recording becomes part of a full-time station called Birdsong Radio.

=== August ===
- 30 August – 100,000 people attend BBC Radio 1's biggest ever Roadshow to celebrate the 25th anniversary of Radio 1. The event, held at Sutton Park in the West Midlands, features live performances from bands including Del Amitri, Aswad, The Farm and Status Quo.

=== September ===
- 7 September – At 6 am, Britain's first national commercial radio station, Classic FM, is launched. The first piece of music played is Handel's Zadok the Priest.
- 27 September – Chris Evans ends what is to be his first stint at BBC Radio 1 to co-present Channel 4's new breakfast show The Big Breakfast.

=== October ===
- 15 October –
  - Commercial radio comes to the Channel Islands, with the launch of Island FM, followed 10 days later by the start of Channel 103.
  - The BBC announces plans to launch a continuous news service on BBC Radio 4’s long wave frequency. The date of 5 April 1994 is set as the launch date.
- 18 October – After previously enjoying success as a pirate radio station, Sunshine 855 in Shropshire officially goes on air.

=== November ===
- No events.

=== December ===
- December – The interdenominational Christian youth radio project Radio Cracker, aimed at raising awareness of poverty in the Third World, returns with 83 different stations broadcasting using restricted service licences in the run-up to Christmas.
- 23 December – Brian Hayes presents The Radio 2 Breakfast Show for the final time. He is succeeded by Terry Wogan in January 1993.
- 27 December – Pick of the Pops is broadcast on BBC Radio 1 for the final time.
- 31 December – Radio Luxemburg ceases to broadcast English programming shortly after 1 am, doing so exactly one year after the station had stopped broadcasting on MW.

=== Unknown ===
- 1992 sees the BBC World Service start to be broadcast on many BBC Local Radio stations when they are not on the air, although most stations in the south and east continue to air BBC Radio 2 during their overnight downtime.

== Station debuts ==
- 21 January – BBC Radio Berkshire
- 1 March – Lincs FM
- 14 March – Heartland FM
- 3 April – Pirate FM
- 14 April – The Worlds Greatest Music Station
- 4 May – Mercury 96.4
- 25 May – Radio Wave 96.5
- 22 June – Radio Wimbledon
- 1 July – KL.FM 96.7
- 4 July – Minster FM
- 1 September – Q96
- 5 September – Spire FM
- 7 September – Classic FM
- 15 September – Sunrise East Midlands
- 15 October – Island FM
- 18 October – Sunshine 855
- 25 October – Channel 103
- 12 December – Lantern FM
- 14 December – Radio Ceredigion

== Programme debuts ==
- 9 January –
  - No Commitments on BBC Radio 4 (1992–2007)
  - Room 101 on BBC Radio 5 (1992–1994)
- 15 September – Night Waves (Free Thinking from 2014) on BBC Radio 3 (1992–Present)
- 9 October – The Mark Steel Solution on BBC Radio 5 (BBC Radio 4 from Series 2) (1992–1996)
- 1 December – Knowing Me Knowing You with Alan Partridge on BBC Radio 4 (1992–1993)

== Continuing radio programmes ==
=== 1940s ===
- Sunday Half Hour (1940–2018)
- Desert Island Discs (1942–Present)
- Letter from America (1946–2004)
- Woman's Hour (1946–Present)
- A Book at Bedtime (1949–Present)

=== 1950s ===
- The Archers (1950–Present)
- The Today Programme (1957–Present)
- Sing Something Simple (1959–2001)
- Your Hundred Best Tunes (1959–2007)

=== 1960s ===
- Farming Today (1960–Present)
- In Touch (1961–Present)
- The World at One (1965–Present)
- The Official Chart (1967–Present)
- Just a Minute (1967–Present)
- The Living World (1968–Present)
- The Organist Entertains (1969–2018)

=== 1970s ===
- PM (1970–Present)
- Start the Week (1970–Present)
- Week Ending (1970–1998)
- You and Yours (1970–Present)
- I'm Sorry I Haven't a Clue (1972–Present)
- Good Morning Scotland (1973–Present)
- Kaleidoscope (1973–1998)
- Newsbeat (1973–Present)
- The News Huddlines (1975–2001)
- File on 4 (1977–Present)
- Money Box (1977–Present)
- The News Quiz (1977–Present)
- Breakaway (1979–1998)
- Feedback (1979–Present)
- The Food Programme (1979–Present)
- Science in Action (1979–Present)

=== 1980s ===
- In Business (1983–Present)
- Sounds of the 60s (1983–Present)
- Loose Ends (1986–Present)

=== 1990s ===
- Jazz Parade (1990–1993)
- Formula Five (1990–1994)
- The Moral Maze (1990–Present)
- Essential Selection (1991–Present)

== Ending this year ==
- 28 May – On the Hour (1991–1992)
- 25 July – Stop the Week (1974–1992)
- 4 August – Flying the Flag (1987–1992)
- 22 August – Flywheel, Shyster, and Flywheel (1990–1992)
- 13 December – Down Your Way (1946–1992)

== Closing this year ==
- 11 February – Airport Information Radio
- 30 December – Radio Luxembourg (1933–1992)

== Deaths ==
- 9 May – Robert Docker, 73, composer (Friday Night Is Music Night)
- 23 June – Joy Nichols, 67, Australian-born musical comedy performer (Take It from Here), dies in United States

== See also ==
- 1992 in British music
- 1992 in British television
- 1992 in the United Kingdom
- List of British films of 1992
