= Joshua Jones (TV series) =

British stop-motion children's television series

- Created by: Rob Lee
- Developed by: Bob Wilson
- Written by: Bob Wilson
- Directed by: Ian Frampton; John Walker
- Starring: George Layton; Barbara Flynn
- Narrated by: George Layton
- Music by: Ben Heneghan; Ian Lawson
- Opening theme: "Joshua Jones" performed by Mal Pope
- Ending theme: "Joshua Jones (Shorter version)" performed by Mal Pope
- Country of origin: United Kingdom (Wales)
- Original languages: English; Welsh
- No. of series: 1
- No. of episodes: 12

Production
- Executive producers: Christopher Grace; Theresa Plummer-Andrews
- Producers: Ian Frampton; John Walker
- Editors: William Oswald; Jane Murrell; Ellen Pierce Lewis
- Running time: 10 minutes
- Production companies: Bumper Films; Prism Art and Design Ltd.

Original release
- Network: BBC1 (English); S4C (Welsh)
- Release: 17 September – 3 December 1991

Joshua Jones is a British stop motion children's television series produced by Bumper Films (the company that has also produced Rocky Hollow, Fireman Sam and Star Hill Ponies) in 1991.

== About ==
The series is about a cheerful Romani man named Joshua Jones who lives on a canal boat with his dog Fairport. They take trips up and down Clearwater Canal, delivering items and carrying out tasks for the folks at Biggott's Wharf and generally having a fun time on the water.

Joshua's bosses are Bapu Karia, a retired Indian admiral, Dakasha "Datsa" Karia, Mr Cashmore's co-worker and Bapu's daughter-in-law, and the get-rich-quick Wilton Cashmore.

Joshua's friends are Joe Laski, the Hungarian farmer who owns a horse named Trojan, Ravi Karia, Mrs. Karia's son (the admiral's grandson) and Fiona, Mr. Cashmore's not-so-money-hungry daughter.

His co-workers are: Sharon, a ditsy blonde girl who owns a catering van, Spanner, Sharon's lazy boyfriend and Daphne Peacock, the vet who takes care of sick and injured animals.

== Characters ==
=== Adults ===
- Joshua Jones – A young Romani man who lives with the Karia family and travels on his canal boat with his dog Fairport. His main job is to transport goods along the canals but he is more than willing to utilise his boat to help out others in a crisis.
- Admirable "Bapu" Karia – A retired Indian admiral who served in the Royal Navy and is always putting his experience to good use in everyday tasks. He is Datsa's father-in-law and Ravi's paternal grandfather.
- Dakasha "Datsa" Karia – The admiral's daughter-in-law and Ravi's mother. She is a very cheerful woman and her first name is only mentioned in the episodes "Tortoise" and "Boomer". Ravi's father never appears, implying that Datsa may be divorced or a widow.
- Joseph "Joe" Laski – A Hungarian-born farmer who lives on a farm on a hill near the tunnel. He owns a draught horse, Trojan.
- Daphne Peacock – The local vetarinian who is often called in to take care of sick or injured animals. She is the only character who is seen to drive a car (however Joe Laski is seen driving a tractor in one episode).
- Sharon Cope – A ditsy but bubbly blonde lady who sells food from her bistro wagon by the canal.
- Spencer "Spanner" Wilkins - Sharon's boyfriend; a lazy, accident-prone redhead in his early twenties who does odd-jobs for Cashmore and various other characters. He often shirks off work to go and eat at Sharon's café.
- Wilton Cashmore – A local rich man who likes to boss his staff around, especially Spanner. He goes to great lengths to try to impress his own boss, the unseen Mr. Biggott. He can be quite nasty at times when he does not get what he wants. He is the father of Fiona, but his wife and Fiona's mother is never seen or mentioned on the show, implying that Mr. Cashmore may be a widower or divorced.
- Mr. Biggott – Wilton's unseen boss. Although he never appears, Mr. Cashmore speaks to him on the phone in almost every episode. The closest the Biggotts get to being seen by the audience is in the episode "Haywire".
- Mrs. Biggott – Mr. Biggott's wife. Like her husband, she never appears. She is only once mentioned in the episode "Haywire".

=== Children ===
- Ravi Karia – An eight-year-old boy who is Datsa's son and Bapu's grandson.
- Fiona Cashmore – An eight-year-old girl who is Wilton Cashmore's daughter.

=== Animals ===
- Fairport – A terrier crossbreed and Joshua's faithful animal friend.
- Trojan – Joe's draught horse.
- Boomer – A blue and yellow macaw who was once loaned to the admiral.
- Tearaway Trevor – Ravi's pet tortoise.

== Production ==
According to Dave Jones, during the show's production, the producers had no idea a similar canal-based children's series was being made for ITV at the same time, Ragdoll’s Rosie and Jim. This series was heavily marketed and overshadowed Joshua Jones, to the extent the series was not a success and lost Bumper Films a lot of money.

The show aired on ABC TV in Australia, TVP1 in Poland, TV2 in New Zealand, Channel 2 in Jordan, Hop! in Israel, BBC Prime in Iceland, BFBS and SSVC Television in Germany, Network 2 in Ireland, DR1 in Denmark and Boom Hop! in Romania. It was never aired in Norway, Sweden or Finland, though was dubbed and released on VHS in those counties.

== Episodes ==
| No. overall | No. in series | Title | Directed by | Written by | Story by | Original release date |
|---|---|---|---|---|---|---|
| 1 | 1 | "Horseplay" | John Walker | Rob Lee | Bob Wilson | 17 September 1991 |
When Trojan the horse falls into the canal, Joshua Jones comes to the rescue.
| 2 | 2 | "Haywire" | John Walker | Rob Lee | Bob Wilson | 24 September 1991 |
There is a storm brewing and Spanner is helping Joe Laski fetch his hay. Meanwhile, Mr Cashmore is organising a buffet for Mr Biggott.
| 3 | 3 | "Treasure" | John Walker | Rob Lee | Bob Wilson | 1 October 1991 |
Spanner, Cashmore and Sharon go digging for treasure when they find a supposed "treasure map".
| 4 | 4 | "Boomer" | John Walker | Rob Lee | Bob Wilson | 8 October 1991 |
Josh rescues Ravi and Fiona from the weir when they get lost while looking for Boomer the parrot, who has escaped.
| 5 | 5 | "Tortoise" | John Walker | Rob Lee | Bob Wilson | 15 October 1991 |
One of Spanner's meat pies is mistaken for Ravi's tortoise.
| 6 | 6 | "Sting" | John Walker | Rob Lee | Bob Wilson | 22 October 1991 |
When some chemicals infect Fairport's eyes, Josh's friends organise a sponsored walk for the ointment his dog needs. Cashmore sponsors Spanner knowing he will not get far, but some treacle pudding and a swarm of wasps prove him wrong.
| 7 | 7 | "Spook" | John Walker | Rob Lee | Bob Wilson | 29 October 1991 |
Ravi and Fiona believe there is a ghost in Joe's barn. Meanwhile, Wilton Cashmore's new burglar alarm is proving unpopular.
| 8 | 8 | "Plum Crazy" | John Walker | Rob Lee | Bob Wilson | 5 November 1991 |
Admiral Karia needs to find an easy way to pick the plums from his plum tree.
| 9 | 9 | "Paperwork" | John Walker | Rob Lee | Bob Wilson | 12 November 1991 |
After decorating her cafe van, Spanner takes Sharon on a picnic, but the wind teaches them not to throw litter around. Note: this was originally set to be the pilot episode of the series, in which the characters had different appearances before they were updated for the eleven other episodes.
| 10 | 10 | "Photo Finish" | John Walker | Rob Lee | Bob Wilson | 19 November 1991 |
Josh has made a raft for Ravi, but disaster strikes when Cashmore borrows it to fish out Mr Biggott's birthday present from the canal.
| 11 | 11 | "Snake Chase" | John Walker | Rob Lee | Bob Wilson | 26 November 1991 |
Daphne Peacock is looking after a grass-snake but mayhem ensues when it meets Trojan the horse.
| 12 | 12 | "The Silver Key" | John Walker | Rob Lee | Bob Wilson | 3 December 1991 |
Admiral Karia is determined to win "The Lock Competition". Meanwhile, Joshua and Joe have trouble with a runaway tyre.

== Home media releases ==
=== VHS ===
One VHS volume of the series was self-distributed by S4C Video Classics for Wales, known as "Gee Ceffyl Bach a Thair Stori Arall". This VHS contained the same four episodes from the Horseplay VHS, but in Welsh.

Two VHS volumes were released in the United Kingdom by BBC Video. The first volume - "Horseplay", released on 15 June 1991, contained the episodes "Horseplay", "Haywire", "Treasure", and "Boomer". The second volume - simply titled "Joshua Jones 2", was released on 5 July 1993, and contained the episodes "Tortoise", "Sting", "Spook", and "Plum Crazy".

=== DVD ===
In Australia, Reel Entertainment released two DVD volumes, each containing six episodes in 2005, simply titled "Volume 1" and "Volume 2". These were "Carry-case" releases, and it was soon followed up with a standard "2 DVD Set" featuring both volumes, making up the complete series.

DVDs of the series have also been released in Poland.

Despite being a British show, the series never had an official DVD release in the UK.

== Books ==
Several paperback books were published by Heinemann Young Books in 1991. The stories were written by Mary Risk and illustrated by The County Studio.

- The C.C. Club
- Josh's Special Delivery (0434948454)
- Duck Tunnel (0434948438)
- Happy Birthday Josh! (0434948411)
- Out of Action (0434962252)
- The Lock Competition (0434962244)
- Vet's Order's
- Piggy In The Middle
- A Party For Bapu
- Heatwave

Eight numbered titles were published by Buzz Books in 1993. The stories were written by Olivia Madden (developed from scripts by Bob Wilson) and illustrated with stills taken from the TV series.

1. Horseplay (1855911396)
2. Going Haywire (1855911388)
3. A Parrot Called Boomer (185591137X)
4. Treasure Trove
5. Photo Finish (1855912333)
6. Snake Chase (1855912341)
7. Tortoise Trail (185591235X)
8. Night Watch (1855912368)
