= 1992 in British music =

This is a summary of 1992 in music in the United Kingdom, including the official charts from that year.

== Summary ==
1992 was a bleak time for the UK Singles Chart, with sales at a very low level. Due to several long chart runs, only 12 singles topped the chart this year (not counting the Queen single, which was a holdover from Christmas 1991), the lowest number since 1962, which also saw 12. In addition, none of them only lasted a week – all lasted at least two, the first time this had happened since 1971.

In the album charts Simply Red had continued success with Stars which would prove to be the second best selling album of the 90's and the best of 91 and 92. Although none of its singles reached no.1, title track Stars peaked at no.8 with all others making the top 40.

Shakespears Sister's hit "Stay" was the longest chart topper of 1992, holding onto the No 1 slot for 8 weeks.

The year saw the start of the ABBA revival, though, with Erasure grabbing the top spot for five weeks in June with their Abba-esque EP, which featured covers of ABBA songs. This was followed by ABBA tribute band Björn Again releasing Erasure-ish in October, which featured covers of Erasure songs. This reached number 25. ABBA's ABBA Gold: Greatest Hits album reached No. 1 for a week in September.

September also saw the Shamen attract controversy with the rave song "Ebeneezer Goode", which, though apparently a song about a fictional character, contained many jokey allusions to the drug Ecstasy, including the chorus "Eezer Goode, Eezer Goode, he's Ebeneezer Goode" (which sounded like "E's are good, E's are good", 'E' being a slang term for Ecstasy). The controversy ensured the song reached number 1 and stayed there for four weeks.

The biggest selling single of the year, and also the only one to sell over a million, was Whitney Houston's cover of "I Will Always Love You", taken from the film The Bodyguard. Originally charting in November, the song hit number 1 later that month, and stayed there until February next year.

The Wedding Present equalled the all-time record of Elvis Presley for most UK Top 30 hits in a year (12), by releasing limited edition, 10,000-copies-only 7" singles every month from January to December. Out of this they achieved their first (and only) ever top ten single, "Come Play With Me" in May of that year.

In the field of classical music, British composer John Palmer won the City of Lucerne Cultural Prize for Music. New classical works by British composers included the Flute Concerto by William Mathias and the String Quartet No. 1 by Mathias's former pupil John Pickard. Classic FM, the first national classical music station to launch since the opening of BBC Radio 3, 25 years earlier, began broadcasting in September.

== Events ==
- 12 February – The KLF perform a thrash metal version of "3am Eternal" with Extreme Noise Terror at the Brit Awards, the performance is rounded off with Bill Drummond firing blanks into the audience before Scott Piering announcing that "The KLF have now left the music business". And at the aftershow party, the band dump a dead sheep outside. The band then announce their retirement, deleting their back catalogue, and their Brit award statue was later found buried in a field near Stonehenge.
- 27 March – The first performance of Robin Holloway's Concerto for violin and orchestra, op 70 takes place in Manchester.
- 20 April – The Freddie Mercury Tribute Concert takes place at Wembley Stadium in London, England. All proceeds go to AIDS research.
- 24 April – David Bowie marries fashion model Iman.
- 9 May – In the opening concert of the Sheffield Chamber Music Festival at the Crucible Theatre, the premiere of Michael Tippett's String Quartet No 5 is given by the Lindsay String Quartet.
- 18 May – Shut Up and Dance release their single "Raving I'm Raving" but only as a limited edition single, as the single samples "Walking In Memphis" by Marc Cohn – who threatened a lawsuit after the duo had not sought permission to use the sample. A compromise is reached, with the duo agreeing to only release it as a limited single, donate all the royalties to charity and to have the single deleted after one week. The controversy saw the single chart at #2, before falling to No.15 the following week before leaving the chart completely.
- 18 June – The Flute Concerto by William Mathias has its premiere at the Criccieth Festival, with soloist William Bennett (to whom the work is dedicated), and the Guildhall String Ensemble.
- 24 June – Andrzej Panufnik's last completed composition, the Cello Concerto receives its world premiere at the Barbican, with soloist Mstislav Rostropovich and the London Symphony Orchestra, conducted by Hugh Wolff.
- 8 August – Morrissey is pelted with coins and missiles after performing at the Madstock Festival, whilst draped in a Union Jack flag and singing "National Front Disco" in front of Madness fans.
- 10 August – The world premiere of Veni, Veni, Emmanuel, a percussion concerto by James MacMillan, takes place at the Proms in the Royal Albert Hall, with soloist Evelyn Glennie.
- 7 September – Classic FM begins broadcasting.
- 9 September – Primal Scream are the winners of the first Mercury Prize award, for their album "Screamadelica". When celebrating, they famously lose their cheque for £20,000 that they were given with the award.
- 30 October – George Michael files a lawsuit against his label Sony, declaring that they had failed to promote his "Listen Without Prejudice Vol. 1" album, and for what he perceived as "professional slavery" – stating that his label left him with "no artistic control". He would lose his case in June 1994. George would later state that he regretted suing his label.
- 22 November – Factory Records is declared bankrupt, and their catalogue is sold to London Records
- 3 December – Bill Wyman announces he is quitting The Rolling Stones.
- 9 December – John Pickard's String Quartet No 1 (1991) is performed for the first time in Colchester by the Britten Quartet.

== Charts ==
=== Number-one singles ===
Chart date (week ending)	Song	Artist(s)	Sales
4 January	"Bohemian Rhapsody/These Are the Days of Our Lives"	Queen	72,000
11 January	"Bohemian Rhapsody/These Are the Days of Our Lives"	Queen	46,485
18 January	"Bohemian Rhapsody/These Are the Days of Our Lives"	Queen	44,235
25 January	"Goodnight Girl"	Wet Wet Wet	41,455
1 February	"Goodnight Girl"	Wet Wet Wet	63,375
8 February	"Goodnight Girl"	Wet Wet Wet	50,985
15 February	"Goodnight Girl"	Wet Wet Wet	45,105
22 February	"Stay"	Shakespear's Sister	43,800
29 February	"Stay"	Shakespear's Sister	54,900
7 March	"Stay"	Shakespear's Sister	53,265
14 March	"Stay"	Shakespear's Sister	42,090
21 March	"Stay"	Shakespear's Sister	38,505
28 March	"Stay"	Shakespear's Sister	34,095
4 April	"Stay"	Shakespear's Sister	34,620
11 April	"Stay"	Shakespear's Sister	28,170
18 April	"Deeply Dippy"	Right Said Fred	32,025
25 April	"Deeply Dippy"	Right Said Fred	48,120
2 May	"Deeply Dippy"	Right Said Fred	29,070
9 May	"Please Don't Go"	K.W.S.	33,405
16 May	"Please Don't Go"	K.W.S.	66,510
23 May	"Please Don't Go"	K.W.S.	71,235
30 May	"Please Don't Go"	K.W.S.	63,315
6 June	"Please Don't Go"	K.W.S.	59,115
13 June	Abba-esque	Erasure	98,295
20 June	Abba-esque	Erasure	86,130
27 June	Abba-esque	Erasure	66,570
4 July	Abba-esque	Erasure	43,275
11 July	Abba-esque	Erasure	36,000
18 July	"Ain't No Doubt"	Jimmy Nail	51,495
25 July	"Ain't No Doubt"	Jimmy Nail	76,860
1 August	"Ain't No Doubt"	Jimmy Nail	67,380
8 August	"Rhythm Is a Dancer"	Snap!	52,080
15 August	"Rhythm Is a Dancer"	Snap!	58,830
22 August	"Rhythm Is a Dancer"	Snap!	60,345
29 August	"Rhythm Is a Dancer"	Snap!	52,005
5 September	"Rhythm Is a Dancer"	Snap!	48,540
12 September	"Rhythm Is a Dancer"	Snap!	38,790
19 September	"Ebeneezer Goode"	The Shamen	41,040
26 September	"Ebeneezer Goode"	The Shamen	44,730
3 October	"Ebeneezer Goode"	The Shamen	36,435
10 October	"Ebeneezer Goode"	The Shamen	34,515
17 October	"Sleeping Satellite"	Tasmin Archer	31,185
24 October	"Sleeping Satellite"	Tasmin Archer	37,485
31 October	"End of the Road"	Boyz II Men	32,520
7 November	"End of the Road"	Boyz II Men	57,030
14 November	"End of the Road"	Boyz II Men	50,250
21 November	"Would I Lie to You?"	Charles & Eddie	77,070
28 November	"Would I Lie to You?"	Charles & Eddie	95,655
5 December	"I Will Always Love You"	Whitney Houston	104,010
12 December	"I Will Always Love You"	Whitney Houston	137,880
19 December	"I Will Always Love You"	Whitney Houston	156,960
26 December	"I Will Always Love You"	Whitney Houston	183,090

=== Number-one albums ===
Chart date (week ending)	Album	Artist(s)
4 January	Stars	Simply Red
11 January	Stars	Simply Red
18 January	Stars	Simply Red
25 January	Stars	Simply Red
1 February	Stars	Simply Red
8 February	High on the Happy Side	Wet Wet Wet
15 February	High on the Happy Side	Wet Wet Wet
22 February	Stars	Simply Red
29 February	Stars	Simply Red
7 March	Stars	Simply Red
14 March	Divine Madness	Madness
21 March	Divine Madness	Madness
28 March	Divine Madness	Madness
4 April	Human Touch	Bruce Springsteen
11 April	Adrenalize	Def Leppard
18 April	Diva	Annie Lennox
25 April	Up	Right Said Fred
2 May	Wish	The Cure
9 May	Stars	Simply Red
16 May	1992 – The Love Album	Carter the Unstoppable Sex Machine
23 May	Fear of the Dark	Iron Maiden
30 May	Michael Ball	Michael Ball
6 June	Back to Front	Lionel Richie
13 June	Back to Front	Lionel Richie
20 June	Back to Front	Lionel Richie
27 June	Back to Front	Lionel Richie
4 July	Back to Front	Lionel Richie
11 July	Back to Front	Lionel Richie
18 July	U.F.Orb	The Orb
25 July	The Greatest Hits: 1966–1992	Neil Diamond
1 August	The Greatest Hits: 1966–1992	Neil Diamond
8 August	The Greatest Hits: 1966–1992	Neil Diamond
15 August	Welcome to Wherever You Are	INXS
22 August	We Can't Dance	Genesis
29 August	Best... I	The Smiths
5 September	Greatest Hits	Kylie Minogue
12 September	Tubular Bells II	Mike Oldfield
19 September	Tubular Bells II	Mike Oldfield
26 September	The Best of Belinda, Volume 1	Belinda Carlisle
3 October	ABBA Gold	ABBA
10 October	Automatic for the People	R.E.M.
17 October	Love Symbol	Prince
24 October	Glittering Prize 81/92	Simple Minds
31 October	Glittering Prize 81/92	Simple Minds
7 November	Glittering Prize 81/92	Simple Minds
14 November	Keep the Faith	Bon Jovi
21 November	Greatest Hits: 1965–1992	Cher
28 November	Pop! The First 20 Hits	Erasure
5 December	Pop! The First 20 Hits	Erasure
12 December	Greatest Hits: 1965–1992	Cher
19 December	Greatest Hits: 1965–1992	Cher
26 December	Greatest Hits: 1965–1992	Cher

== Year-end charts ==
=== Best-selling singles ===
No.	Title	Artist	Peak position	Estimated sales
1	"I Will Always Love You"	Whitney Houston	1	1,000,000+
2	"Rhythm Is a Dancer"	Snap!	1	675,000
3	"Would I Lie to You?"	Charles & Eddie	1	600,000
4	"Stay"	Shakespears Sister	1	
5	"Please Don't Go"/"Game Boy"	KWS	1	
6	"End of the Road"	Boyz II Men	1	
7	Abba-esque (EP)	Erasure	1	
8	"Ain't No Doubt"	Jimmy Nail	1	
9	"Heal the World"	Michael Jackson	2	
10	"Goodnight Girl"	Wet Wet Wet	1	
11	"Baker Street"	Undercover	2	
12	"Deeply Dippy"	Right Said Fred	1	
13	"Ebeneezer Goode"	The Shamen	1	
14	"Hazard"	Richard Marx	3	
15	"Bohemian Rhapsody"/"These Are the Days of Our Lives"	Queen	1	
16	"Sleeping Satellite"	Tasmin Archer	1	
17	"The Best Things in Life Are Free"	Luther Vandross and Janet Jackson with special guests BBD and Ralph Tresvant	2	
18	"It's My Life"	Dr. Alban	2	
19	"Just Another Day"	Jon Secada	5	
20	"On a Ragga Tip"	SL2	2	
21	"Achy Breaky Heart"	Billy Ray Cyrus	3	
22	"My Girl"	The Temptations	2	
23	"People Everyday"	Arrested Development	2	
24	"I Love Your Smile" (remix)	Shanice	2	
25	"Jump"	Kris Kross	2	
26	"Twilight Zone"	2 Unlimited	2	
27	"Sesame's Treet"	Smart E's	2	
28	"I'm Doing Fine Now"	The Pasadenas	4	
29	"I'm Gonna Get You"	Bizarre Inc featuring Angie Brown	3	
30	"Barcelona"	Freddie Mercury & Montserrat Caballé	2	
31	"To Be with You"	Mr. Big	3	
32	"My Destiny"	Lionel Richie	7	
33	"Don't You Want Me"	Felix	6	
34	"Knockin' On Heaven's Door"	Guns N' Roses	2	
35	"Heartbeat"	Nick Berry	2	
36	"Something Good"	Utah Saints	4	
37	"Could It Be Magic"	Take That	4 (Note: Reached number 3 in 1993)	
38	"I Wonder Why"	Curtis Stigers	5	
39	"Everything About You"	Ugly Kid Joe	3	
40	"I'll Be There"	Mariah Carey featuring Trey Lorenz	2	
41	"Temptation" (Brothers in Rhythm Remix)	Heaven 17	4	
42	"This Used to Be My Playground"	Madonna	3	
43	"Out of Space"	The Prodigy	5	
44	"Shake Your Head"	Was (Not Was)	4	
45	"Too Much Love Will Kill You"	Brian May	5	
46	"Everybody in the Place"	The Prodigy	2	
47	"Slam Jam"	The WWF Superstars	4	
48	"Finally"	CeCe Peniston	2	
49	"Never Let Her Slip Away"	Undercover	5	
50	"Give Me Just a Little More Time"	Kylie Minogue	2	

=== Best-selling albums ===
No.	Title	Artist	Peak position
1	Stars	Simply Red	1
2	Back to Front	Lionel Richie	1
3	Greatest Hits: 1965–1992	Cher	1
4	Glittering Prize 81/92	Simple Minds	1
5	Dangerous	Michael Jackson	4 (Note: Reached number 1 in 1991)
6	Diva	Annie Lennox	1
7	Timeless: The Classics	Michael Bolton	3
8	Divine Madness	Madness	1
9	We Can't Dance	Genesis	2 (Note: Reached number 1 in 1991)
10	Up	Right Said Fred	1
11	Pop!: The First 20 Hits	Erasure	1
12	ABBA Gold	ABBA	1
13	Greatest Hits	Gloria Estefan	2
14	Hormonally Yours	Shakespears Sister	3
15	High on the Happy Side	Wet Wet Wet	1
16	Real Love	Lisa Stansfield	3
17	Automatic for the People	R.E.M.	1
18	The Way We Walk, Volume One: The Shorts	Genesis	3
19	Greatest Hits II	Queen	2 (Note: Reached number 1 in 1991)
20	Nevermind	Nirvana	7
21	Simply the Best	Tina Turner	2
22	Tubular Bells II	Mike Oldfield	1
23	Curtis Stigers	Curtis Stigers	7
24	The Commitments Original Soundtrack	Various Artists	8 (Note: Reached number 4 in 1991)
25	Tears Roll Down (Greatest Hits 82–92)	Tears for Fears	2
26	Boss Drum	The Shamen	3
27	Erotica	Madonna	2
28	The Best of Belinda, Volume 1	Belinda Carlisle	1
29	The Freddie Mercury Album	Freddie Mercury	4
30	The Greatest Hits: 1966–1992	Neil Diamond	1
31	Achtung Baby	U2	8 (Note: Reached number 2 in 1991)
32	Take That and Party	Take That	3
33	Diamonds and Pearls	Prince and the New Power Generation	8 (Note: Reached number 2 in 1991)
34	Greatest Hits	Queen	6 (Note: Reached number 1 in 1981)
35	Adrenalize	Def Leppard	1
36	Shepherd Moons	Enya	12 (Note: Reached number 1 in 1991)
37	Woodface	Crowded House	6
38	Use Your Illusion II	Guns N' Roses	10 (Note: Reached number 1 in 1991)
39	Waking Up the Neighbours	Bryan Adams	11 (Note: Reached number 1 in 1991)
40	Out of Time	R.E.M.	13 (Note: Reached number 1 in 1991)
41	Michael Crawford Performs Andrew Lloyd Webber	Michael Crawford	7
42	Use Your Illusion I	Guns N' Roses	18 (Note: Reached number 2 in 1991)
43	The Force Behind the Power	Diana Ross	15 (Note: Reached number 11 in 1991)
44	The One	Elton John	2
45	This Thing Called Love: The Greatest Hits of Alexander O'Neal	Alexander O'Neal	4
46	Legend	Bob Marley and the Wailers	18 (Note: Reached number 1 in 1984)
47	Keep the Faith	Bon Jovi	1
48	Symbol	Prince and the New Power Generation	1
49	Seal	Seal	5 (Note: Reached number 1 in 1991)
50	Time, Love & Tenderness	Michael Bolton	6 (Note: Reached number 3 in 1991)

== Music awards ==
=== Brit Awards ===
The 1992 Brit Awards winners were:

- Best British producer: Trevor Horn
- Best international solo artist: Prince
- Best soundtrack: The Commitments
- British album: Seal: Seal
- British newcomer: Beverley Craven
- British female solo artist – Lisa Stansfield
- British group: Simply Red
- British male solo artist: Seal
- British single: Queen – "These Are the Days of Our Lives"
- British video: Seal – "Killer"
- International newcomer: P.M. Dawn
- International group: R.E.M.
- Outstanding contribution: Freddie Mercury

=== Mercury Music Prize ===
The 1992 Mercury Music Prize was awarded to Primal Scream – Screamadelica.

== Classical music ==
- Alun Hoddinott – Symphony No.9 "Vision of Eternity"
- James MacMillan – Veni, Veni, Emmanuel (concerto for percussion and orchestra)
- William Mathias – Flute Concerto
- David Sawer – Byrnan Wood

== Opera ==
- Jonathan Harvey – Inquest of Love.

== Film and incidental music ==
- Michael Nyman – The Piano directed by Jane Campion.

== Births ==
- 10 February – Misha B, singer-songwriter
- 9 April – LD, drill rapper
- 26 April – Danielle Hope, singer and actress
- 19 May – Sam Smith, singer-songwriter
- 4 July – Nick Hissom, singer
- 8 July – Benjamin Grosvenor, pianist
- 2 August – Charli XCX, singer-songwriter
- 4 August – S-X, producer and singer-songwriter
- 16 September – Jessica Plummer, actress and singer
- 5 October – Alex Prior, conductor and composer
- 22 October
  - 21 Savage, London-born American hip-hop artist
  - Carrie Hope Fletcher, singer
- 21 November – Conor Maynard, singer
- date unknown – Christopher Bond, brass band composer

== Deaths ==
- 8 February – Denny Wright, guitarist and songwriter, 67 (bladder cancer)
- 29 April – Stephen Oliver, opera composer, 42 (AIDS-related)
- 9 May – Robert Docker, composer, 73
- 20 June – Sir Charles Groves, conductor, 77
- 5 July – Georgia Brown, singer and actress, the original Nancy in Oliver!, 58 (surgical complications)
- 29 July – William Mathias, composer, 57
- 3 August – Don Lang, trombonist and singer, 67 (cancer)
- 19 September – Sir Geraint Evans, operatic baritone, 70
- 7 October – Harold Truscott, pianist, composer, broadcaster and music writer, 78
- 7 November – Henri Temianka, virtuoso violinist, conductor, author and music educator, 85
- 29 November – Paul Ryan, singer, songwriter and record producer, 44 (cancer)
- 22 December – Harry Bluestone, violinist, 85
- date unknown
  - Paul Hammond, drummer of Atomic Rooster (accidental drug overdose)
  - Malcolm MacDonald, composer

== See also ==
- 1992 in British radio
- 1992 in British television
- 1992 in the United Kingdom
- List of British films of 1992
