= Extraordinary People =

Extraordinary People may refer to:

- Extraordinary People (2015 book and video series), by author and musician Michael Hearst
- Extraordinary People (1992 TV series), documentary series broadcast on ITV between 1992 and 1993
- Extraordinary People (2003 TV series), documentary series broadcast on Channel 5 since
