= Jonathan Hodge =

British composer (1941–2019)

Jonathan Philip Hodge (26 January 1941 – 7 July 2019) was a British composer who wrote more than 2,000 jingles for TV and radio, including the Shake n' Vac tune.

== Life and career ==
Hodge was born in London in 1941.

He wrote the scores for Villain (1971), featuring Richard Burton, and Great (1975), an Oscar-winning animated musical documentary about engineer Isambard Kingdom Brunel directed by Bob Godfrey. He also wrote and produced Fiddley Foodle Bird (1992), a children's animated series for the BBC narrated by Bruce Forsyth, wrote pop music, and had a No.3 hit in 1978 with "If I Had Words", sung by Scott Fitzgerald and Yvonne Keeley, for which he wrote the lyrics. The song sold millions worldwide.

He died from multiple organ failure on 7 July 2019, aged 78, at the William Harvey Hospital in Ashford, Kent.
