= List of British films of 1992 =

A list of films produced in the United Kingdom in 1992 (see 1992 in film):

== 1992 ==
Title	Director	Cast	Genre	Notes
1992
1492: Conquest of Paradise	Ridley Scott	Gérard Depardieu, Sigourney Weaver	Epic	
As You Like It	Christine Edzard	Cyril Cusack, James Fox	Comedy/drama	
Bad Company	Julian Richards	Caroline Berry, Sean Carlsen	Crime drama	
Batman Returns	Tim Burton	Michael Keaton, Danny DeVito, Michelle Pfeiffer, Christopher Walken, Michael Gough, Pat Hingle, Michael Murphy	Superhero	Co-production with the US
Bitter Moon	Roman Polanski	Hugh Grant, Emmanuelle Seigner, Kristin Scott Thomas	Drama	
Bram Stoker's Dracula	Francis Ford Coppola	Gary Oldman, Winona Ryder, Anthony Hopkins, Keanu Reeves	Vampire/horror	
The Bridge	Sydney Macartney	Saskia Reeves, David O'Hara	Literary drama	
Carry On Columbus	Gerald Thomas	Jim Dale, Bernard Cribbins, Rik Mayall, Nigel Planer, Peter Richardson, Alexei Sayle, Keith Allen, Martin Clunes	Comedy	
Chaplin	Richard Attenborough	Robert Downey Jr., Dan Aykroyd, Geraldine Chaplin	Biopic	
City of Joy	Roland Joffé	Om Puri, Shabana Azmi	Drama	
The Crying Game	Neil Jordan	Stephen Rea, Miranda Richardson, Jaye Davidson	Drama	Co-production with Japan
Damage	Louis Malle	Jeremy Irons, Juliette Binoche, Miranda Richardson	Drama	
Emily Brontë's Wuthering Heights	Peter Kosminsky	Juliette Binoche, Ralph Fiennes, Jeremy Northam	Drama	
Enchanted April	Mike Newell	Josie Lawrence, Miranda Richardson	Romance/drama	
Freddie as F.R.O.7	Jon Acevski	Ben Kingsley, Jenny Agutter	Fantasy/adventure	Animated film
Hellraiser III: Hell on Earth	Anthony Hickox	Terry Farrell, Paula Marshall, Kevin Bernhardt, Peter Boynton, Doug Bradley	Supernatural/horror	
Howards End	James Ivory	Emma Thompson, Helena Bonham Carter, Anthony Hopkins	Literary drama	Co-production with Japan & US; Based on the novel by E. M. Forster; won the Best Lead Actress Oscar and the BAFTA for Best Film; entered at Cannes
Into the West	Mike Newell	Gabriel Byrne, Ellen Barkin	Family	Co-production with the Republic of Ireland
Just like a Woman	Christopher Monger	Julie Walters, Adrian Pasdar, Paul Freeman	Comedy/drama	
The Lawnmower Man	Brett Leonard	Jeff Fahey, Pierce Brosnan	Horror	Co-production with Japan
The Long Day Closes	Terence Davies	Marjorie Yates, Leigh McCormack, Anthony Watson	Drama	Entered into the 1992 Cannes Film Festival
The Muppet Christmas Carol	Brian Henson	Michael Caine, Dave Goelz, Steve Whitmire, Jerry Nelson, Frank Oz	Musical	
Orlando	Sally Potter	Tilda Swinton, Billy Zane	Fantasy	
Peter's Friends	Kenneth Branagh	Hugh Laurie, Stephen Fry, Emma Thompson	Comedy/drama	
The Pleasure Principle	David Cohen	Peter Firth, Chloe Davies	Comedy/drama	
Prague	Ian Sellar			Screened at the 1992 Cannes Film Festival
The Railway Station Man	Michael Whyte	Julie Christie, Donald Sutherland	Drama	
Sarafina!	Darrell James Roodt	Whoopi Goldberg, Leleti Khumalo	Drama	
Shining Through	David Seltzer	Michael Douglas, Melanie Griffith	Thriller	Co-production with the US
Split Second	Tony Maylam	Rutger Hauer, Kim Cattrall	Fantasy/action	
Tale of a Vampire	Shimako Satō	Julian Sands, Suzanna Hamilton, Kenneth Cranham	Horror	Co-production with Japan
Utz	George Sluizer	Armin Mueller-Stahl		Entered into the 42nd Berlin International Film Festival
Waterland	Stephen Gyllenhaal	Jeremy Irons, Sinéad Cusack	Drama	

== See also ==
- 1992 in film
- 1992 in British music
- 1992 in British radio
- 1992 in British television
- 1992 in the United Kingdom
- List of 1992 box office number-one films in the United Kingdom
