= Star Hill Ponies =

- Developed by: Mike Young; Liz Young
- Written by: Maria Jones; Pamela Hickey; Dennys McCoy
- Directed by: John Walker
- Voices of: Josie Lawrence; Andrew Sachs
- Countries of origin: United Kingdom; United States
- Original languages: English; Welsh
- No. of series: 2
- No. of episodes: 26

Production
- Executive producers: Meirion Davies; Theresa Plummer-Andrews (series 1); Anne Miles (series 2)
- Producers: Liz Young; Ian Frampton
- Editor: Wil Oswald
- Running time: 10 minutes
- Production companies: Mike Young Productions; Bumper Films

Original release
- Network: BBC One (English); S4C (Welsh)
- Release: 1999 – 2002

Star Hill Ponies is a children's stop-motion animation series produced by Bumper Films and co-produced by Mike Young Productions for S4C. It was the last production by Bumper Films before they shut down in February 2002. The voice actors are Josie Lawrence and Andrew Sachs.

== Plot ==
The series follows a young girl named Baz who dreams of nothing more than finding a best friend. Her wish comes true when two roaming Welsh ponies Molly and Dylan, show up at her farm with Shetland pony Scruffy. Their playful frolics change her life forever.

== Production ==
Star Hill Ponies was co-produced by Mike Young Productions in Los Angeles and Bumper Films in Weston-super-Mare, England for S4C and BBC. It is Bumper Films' only television series co-produced in the United Kingdom and North America. S4C International handled worldwide distribution rights to the series.

== Characters ==
=== Ponies ===
- Dylan - the brown Welsh pony, with a black mane.
- Molly - the dapple grey Welsh pony, with a grey mane.
- Scruffy - the podgy chestnut Shetland pony, with a long straw-coloured mane. His hobbies are eating and being naughty.

=== Humans ===
- Beatrice "Baz" Watkins -A preteen girl and the owner of the ponies.
- Will Watkins - Baz's father.
- Kath Watkins - Baz's mother.
- Thomas - Baz's best friend.
- Missus Horace Morris - the snobbish landlady who cannot stand ponies.
- Jim - the local odd job man and good friend of the ponies.
- Ambrose Higgins - the half-witted beach shop owner.
- Lottie - the mobile shop owner. Only appears in Series 2.
- Nick - the blacksmith. Only appears in Series 2.

== Episodes ==
=== Series 1 (1998-99) ===
#	Title	Summary	Recording Date	Broadcast Date
1	Birthday Tea		2 November 1998	7 April 1999
2	Scruffy Pays the Price		9 November 1998	14 April 1999
3	The Outing		16 November 1998	21 April 1999
4	Nicked Knickers		23 November 1998	28 April 1999
5	Kidnapped		30 November 1998	5 May 1999
6	Scruffy Helps Out		7 December 1999	11 May 1999
7	Art for Scruffy's Sake		14 December 1998	19 May 1999
8	Circus Tricks		21 December 1998	26 May 1999
9	Surfin' Sea Horse		28 December 1998	2 June 1999
10	High Tea, High Jinks		4 January 1999	11 August 1999
11	Dylan for the Cup		11 January 1999	14 July 1999
12	Lost		18 January 1999	21 July 1999
13	Bugged		25 January 1999	4 August 1999

=== Series 2 (2002) ===
1. Just Desserts
2. Apple Pie
3. Hide and Seek
4. Nothing to be Afraid Of
5. Mrs. HM's Parade
6. Tall Tales
7. The Mystery of Missing Ethel
8. A Fine Mess
9. Scarypony Scarecrow
10. Thomas Riding High
11. The Unlucky Horseshoe
12. The Way Home
13. All I Want for Christmas

== Home media ==
=== VHS releases ===
In 1999, one single video of the show was by BBC Worldwide Ltd with five episodes from the first series on it.

VHS video title	Year of release	Episodes
Star Hill Ponies: Nicked Knickers and Other Stories (BBCV 6772)	4 May 1999	"Nicked Knickers"; "The Outing"; "Art for Scruffy's Sake"; "Surfin' Sea Horse"; "Kidnapped"

=== DVD releases ===
In 2006, the series was released on three DVDs by Blackhorse Entertainment.

DVD video title	Year of release	Episodes
Star Hill Ponies: Scruffy Helps Out and Seven Other Fantastic Episodes (S4C)	10 April 2006	"Scruffy Helps Out"; "Art for Scruffy's Sake"; "The Outing"; "Birthday Tea"; "Circus Tricks"; "Scruffy Pays the Price"; "High Tea, High-Jinks"; "Nicked Knickers"
Star Hill Ponies: Mrs HM's Parade and Seven Other Fantasic Episodes (S4C004)	5 June 2006	"Mrs HM's Parade"; "Tall Tales"; "The Mystery of the Missing Ethel"; "Nothing to be Afraid of"; "Scarepony Scarecrow"; "Just Desserts"; "Apple Pie"; "Hide 'n' Seek"
Star Hill Ponies: Dylan for the Cup and Other Great Stories (S4C)	11 September 2006	"Dylan for the Cup"; "Kidnapped"; "Surfin' Sea Horse"; "Lost"; "Bugged"; "A Fine Mess"; "Thomas Riding High"; "The Unlucky Horseshoe"; "The Way Home"; "All I Want for Christmas"
