= Bob Wilson (cartoonist) =

English children's writer and cartoonist

Bob Wilson ('Robert Peter Wilson' - born 29 October 1942) is a cartoonist, artist and author of children's books from North Staffordshire. He is probably best known for the Stanley Bagshaw series of children's books. He is also responsible for the Pump Street Primary series of books and the Joshua Jones TV cartoon series. The illustrations from the books were used to create a six-part Yorkshire Television series for ITV, first broadcast in 1984.

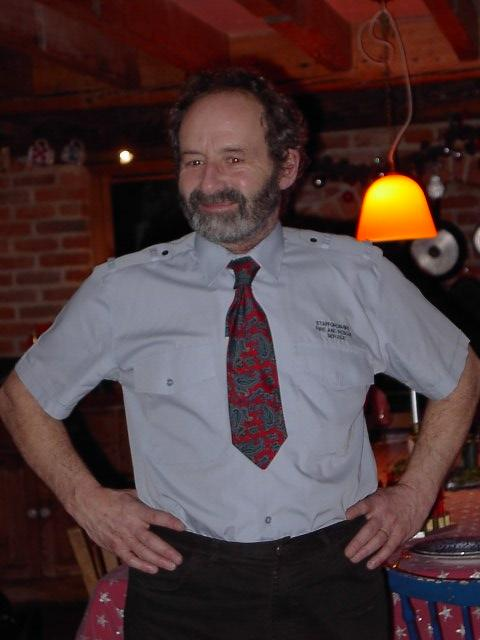
At his home in Derbyshire

== The Stanley Bagshaw series ==
The Stanley Bagshaw series is entirely written in rhyme. In the series, Stanley is portrayed as a young boy around 10 years of age. He lives in a fictional town called "Huddersgate", Oop North, “where it’s boring and slow” – with his Grandma at number four, Prince Albert Row. Stanley goes through a series of unlikely adventures in which he is invariably the hero, defeating thieves and preventing tragedies. A 1989 documentary by Thames Television illustrates the methods Wilson uses to construct the books.

- Stanley Bagshaw and the Fourteen Foot Wheel Hamish Hamilton 1981 (ISBN 0241106346)
- Stanley Bagshaw and the Twenty Two Ton Whale Hamish Hamilton 1983 (ISBN 0241108128)
- Stanley Bagshaw and the Mafeking Square Cheese Robbery Hamish Hamilton 1985 (ISBN 0241112303)
- Stanley Bagshaw and the Short-Sighted Football Trainer Hamish Hamilton 1986 (ISBN 0241117836)
- Stanley Bagshaw and the Rather Dangerous Miracle Cure Hamish Hamilton.1988 (ISBN 0241124190)
- Stanley Bagshaw and the Mad Magic Mix-up Hamish Hamilton 1990 (ISBN 0241127475)
- Stanley Bagshaw and the Ice-cream Ghost Hamish Hamilton 1992 (ISBN 0241127602)
- Stanley Bagshaw and the Frantic Film Fiasco Hamish Hamilton 1996 (ISBN 0241132312)
- Stanley Bagshaw and the Show-jumping Mouse Penguin Nov. 1998 (ISBN 014038023X)
