= Fiddley Foodle Bird =

British children's television series

- Created by: Jonathan Hodge
- Written by: Jonathan Hodge; Stuart Lethwood
- Directed by: Tony Garth
- Starring: Dennis Waterman; Kate Robbins; Jimmy Hibbert; Jonathan Hodge; Julian Littman; Stuart Leathwood; Tammy Coleman
- Narrated by: Bruce Forsyth
- Opening theme: "The Fiddley Foodle Bim Bam Boom"
- Ending theme: "The Fiddley Foodle Bim Bam Boom (Reprise)"
- Country of origin: United Kingdom
- No. of episodes: 13

Production
- Executive producers: Theresa Plummer-Andrews (BBC); Chris Ambler; Andy Taylor (H.A.P.P.Y Animation)
- Producer: Jonathan Hodge
- Running time: 10 minutes
- Production companies: HIT Entertainment; Fiddley Foodle Bird Productions; H.A.P.P.Y. Animation

Original release
- Network: BBC1
- Release: 8 January – 1 April 1992

The Fiddley Foodle Bird is a British children's animated musical series written by Jonathan Hodge, and narrated by Bruce Forsyth. Thirteen ten-minute episodes of the series were made in total, with one story continuing through the episodes. They were made in 1991 and broadcast in 1992 on BBC One at 4:15. It was produced by H.A.P.P.Y. Animation and Fiddley Foodle Bird Productions in association with HIT Entertainment and was broadcast in over 30 different countries worldwide. The show also continued airing on the BBC until 2001.

== Plot ==
The main character of the series is a bird, whose full name is the "Fiddley Foodle Bim Bam Boodle Oo Diddley-Doodle Oodle Bird". The character is voiced by Dennis Waterman (actor and singer famous for his roles as Terry McCann in Minder and Detective Sergeant George Carter in The Sweeney). The bird was originally nothing more than just a picture in a book, which was found by a young boy named Algernon. He wished that the bird would come to life, and when the wish came true they set out on an adventure with Algernon's friends, the eternally hungry Princess Toto, and his housekeeper, the overly strict Mrs. Grumblebaum. The aim of the mission is to find Algernon's lost parents, two members of the Potty Explorer's Club- Carzy and Maudy. They were lost exploring in a sieve. However, Algernon's dastardly Uncle Arbathnot is out to ensure that their mission does not succeed, and also to seize a mysterious treasure chest. He is assisted by a muscle-man named Damage, a Frenchman named Flannel, and a pirate named Pierre Head, who, like most pirates, is accompanied by a parrot – a wise-cracking green glove puppet. The show features a guest appearance from Cilla Black, who voiced the President of the Potty Explorer's Club.

== Episodes ==
No.	Title	Directed by	Original release date
1	"Foodle Power"	Tony Garth	January 8, 1992
2	"Sea Saw"	Tony Garth	January 15, 1992
3	"Cock-a-Doodle Crazy"	Tony Garth	January 22, 1992
4	"The Yolks on Who?"	Tony Garth	January 29, 1992
5	"Catch My Drift"	Tony Garth	February 5, 1992
6	"Up the Pole"	Tony Garth	February 12, 1992
7	"There’s No Business Like Snow Business"	Tony Garth	February 19, 1992
8	"What the Dino Saw"	Tony Garth	February 26, 1992
9	"Hic Hic Wooray"	Tony Garth	March 4, 1992
10	"Goin’ Bananas"	Tony Garth	March 11, 1992
11	"Planks a Lot"	Tony Garth	March 18, 1992
12	"Squids In"	Tony Garth	March 25, 1992
13	"Will Ee No Come Back Again?"	Tony Garth	April 1, 1992

== Voices ==
- Dennis Waterman – Fiddley Foodle Bird
- Bruce Forsyth – Narrator
- Kate Robbins – Mrs. Grumblebaum
- Jimmy Hibbert - Various
- Jonathan Hodge - Various
- Julian Littman - Various
- Stuart Leathwood - Various
- Tammy Coleman - Various

== Merchandise ==
=== Video releases ===
The entire series was released on a set of VHS titles in 2001. There was also another video released by Pocket Money Video which contained the first eight episodes.

=== Music release ===
A soundtrack of the series was also released on CD and cassette which contained the introduction by Bruce Forsyth, a full extended version of the main title theme song, and all of the songs that were featured in all thirteen episodes of the series. It was released by EMI Music Publishing in 1992, the same year as when the show first aired.

== Sources ==
- Ben Lawrence. "Fiddley Foodle Bird (1992)" in "Bruce Forsyth: 11 surprises from his career". The Daily Telegraph. 19 August 2017.
- Barbara Holloway. "Caliber of Irish Facilities on the Rise". The Hollywood Reporter. Volume 312. Issues 1 to 17. Ireland Special Report. April 1990. Page S-10.
- (1992) 18 Keyboard 26
- "Fiddley Foodle Bird". TV Guide.
- Bowker's Directory of Videocassettes for Children 1999. R R Bowker. 1999. p 76. Google
- Film and Television Handbook. British Film Institute. 1992. p 184. Google
- The WH Smith Complete Guide to What's On Video. WH Smith Edition: November 1993. Home Entertainment Corporation plc. Orton Southgate, Peterborough. 1993. p 201.
- "The Fiddley Foodle Bird". Bowker's Complete Video Directory 2001. R R Bowker. p 582. Google
  - Bowker's Complete Video Directory 1998. Volume 2.
- Tracklog 1997: Comprehensive guide to Popular music tracks. First Edition. Trade Service Information Ltd. 1997. ISBN 978-0-9512985-4-1. p 216.
- "Max Wall". Rare Record Price Guide 2014. Record Collector. Diamond Publishing. p 1310
- Mike Preston (comp). Tele-Tunes: 2000 Edition 2: The Reference Book of Music for Television Commercials, Programmes, Films and Shows. Nineteenth Edition. Mike Preston Music. 2000. p 111.
