= Radio Wimbledon =

Coordinates: 51°26′1.48″N 0°12′50.63″W

London; England
- Frequency: 87.7FM

Programming
- Format: FM, Online

Ownership
- Owner: AELTC

Radio Wimbledon was the official radio station to the annual Wimbledon Tennis Championships at the AELTC in Wimbledon. Their contract finished in 2011. It has now been replaced by the similar Live@Wimbledon station.

== About ==
Radio Wimbledon broadcasts daily on 87.7FM between 8 am and approximately 10 pm during the Championships at Wimbledon. Broadcast from specially designed studios near the Press Centre at the AELTC, it is available in an area approximately within a 5-mile radius of the AELTC under a Restricted Service Licence, as well as online at www.wimbledon.org. Launched in 1992 it provides extensive commentaries for matches using a team of reporters around the ground. More recently, the service has been extended to provide dedicated commentaries for Centre Court on 96.3FM and No. 1 Court on 97.8FM. Due to the use of lower powered frequencies, these services are only available by radio for visitors in the stadiums, but are also available online. Radios are available in the grounds, though visitors are asked to use headphones at all times.

Since the station has been available online, the number of listeners has increased dramatically around the world to a peak of 600,000. It is perhaps the only station with such extensive ball by ball coverage that is available internationally, particularly as the BBC doesn't own the rights to broadcast through radio worldwide. However, a good relationship between BBC Radio 5 Live and Radio Wimbledon has meant that material is sometimes shared between the two stations. Radio Wimbledon's reporting style is more impartial than the BBC, but there is still some patriotic support shown for British players such as Tim Henman and Andy Murray. In the United States, Radio Wimbledon coverage is distributed nationally via Sirius XM Satellite Radio.

Wimbledon was the first Grand Slam tournament to offer radio coverage of this type. Other events have followed such as the Australian Open which launched a radio station in 2000.

== Content ==
Radio Wimbledon broadcasts live commentaries from matches all around the ground, as well as frequent updates of scores, results and news. The reporters often report from the "Crow's Nest" or from other locations around the ground. It plays popular music, provides local travel news, weather reports and holds competitions. The presenters are often joined by guests to discuss the tennis. These regular guests have included Nick Bollettieri and Judy Murray.

Radio Wimbledon often asks for listeners to contribute interesting questions which can be discussed on air. These can be sent through e-mail or, in 2007, SMS. Listeners can also send comments using these methods.

In the evenings, press conferences are often broadcast as well as a summary of the day's play. The order of play for the following day is often announced when it becomes available.

When the station is off-air, a repeated "loop" containing a summary of the day's matches is played along with Radio Wimbledon's distinctive theme tune. From 2007, these summaries have been available on www.wimbledon.org as downloadable podcasts.

On Middle Sunday, the 9:30 am Sung Eucharist service is usually broadcast from the nearby St Mary's Church. The church has also been the location of the radio mast used by Radio Wimbledon.

From the Monday before the Championships begin, a similar loop is used to bring coverage from the Qualifying rounds and a review of the previous year's tournament. The draws are also broadcast on the station when they are announced. In 2007, Radio Wimbledon was launched on 18 June and stopped broadcasting on 9 July.

=== Theme Tune ===
Radio Wimbledon's theme tune is called "Purple and Green" and has been used since 1996 when it was composed by a British Composer called Tony Cox. It has also been used in the past by the BBC Television Coverage.

For the 2008 Championships, the theme tune was slightly altered.

=== Catchphrases ===
Some of the following catchphrases are used whilst Radio Wimbledon is broadcasting:

- "Keeping you on the ball: Radio Wimbledon, 87.7FM"
- "Radio Wimbledon: It's Game, Set and Match for Tennis Coverage on 87.7FM"
- "Radio Wimbledon: First for Results, Interviews, Expert Comment, News, Weather and Travel. It's all on 87.7FM"

Popular tennis players occasionally also announce a message. These have included Tim Henman, Rafael Nadal and Amélie Mauresmo.

== Presenters and Commentators ==
Radio Wimbledon's main presenters are Nick Dye and Sam Lloyd (freelance sports presenter and broadcaster).

=== Presenting Schedule ===
In 2007 and 2008, the schedule for presenters was generally the following:

- 08h00 – 12h00: Sam Lloyd
- 12h00 – 16h00: Nick Dye
- 16h00 – 19h00: Sam Lloyd
- 19h00 – 22h00: Nick Dye

=== Commentating Team ===
The commentating team include:

- Gigi Salmon (Sports Journalist. Reporter for Chelsea TV.)
- Nick Lester
- Rupert Bell (Sports Reporter and Broadcaster with 15 years experience. He commentates on Tennis, Rugby Union and Golf.)
- Nigel Bidmead (Journalist for BBC London Sport.)
- Guy Swindells (Journalist for BBC London Sport.)
- Lucy Ahl (Retired British Tennis Player.)
- Nadine Towell (Reporter for BBC WM.)

== See also ==
- The Championships, Wimbledon
