= Rosie & Ruff in Puppydog Tales =

- Genre: Children's animation
- Created by: Hilary Hayton
- Narrated by: Victoria Wood
- No. of seasons: 1
- No. of episodes: 13

Original release
- Network: BBC
- Release: 17 September – 10 December 1992

Rosie & Ruff in Puppydog Tales is a British children's television cartoon created by Hilary Hayton, creator of Crystal Tipps and Alistair. The show was narrated and scripted by Victoria Wood. The series was screened in Canada on the Knowledge Network and aired in 1989 before finally airing in its country of origin on 17 September 1992. The series was broadcast on the BBC only running for 13 episodes but was repeated through till 1996. In the mid and late 1990s, the series was later broadcast on the defunct children's cable and satellite television channel The Children's Channel and the former digital television network for children called Carlton Kids.

The cartoon revolves around Rosie, a sensible but cheerful dog who is teaching her friend Ruff, a rather naughty dog, lessons and morals.

During the beginning of each episode Rosie reports the news and at the end of each episode there is a song about what is learned during the episode.

Two VHS videos of the show were released in the early 1990s.

The show was also available briefly on the BBC Store website.

== Episodes ==
No.	Title	Original release date
1	"Sharing"	17 September 1992
2	"Lazy"	24 September 1992
3	"Care on the Road"	1 October 1992
4	"Take Care of Pets"	8 October 1992
5	"Jealousy"	15 October 1992
6	"Vandals"	22 October 1992
7	"Be Kind to Old Folk"	29 October 1992
8	"Good Manners"	5 November 1992
9	"Playtime"	12 November 1992
10	"Beware of Fire"	26 November 1992
11	"Don't Be Dirty"	3 December 1992
12	"Watch Out for Strangers"	10 December 1992
13	"Untidy"	18 December 1992
