= Bumper Films =

British stop motion animation studio

- Type: Associate
- Industry: Entertainment
- Genre: Children’s
- Founded: 1982
- Founder: Ian Frampton; John Walker
- Defunct: 2002
- Fate: Closed
- Headquarters: Weston-super-Mare, England
- Key people: Ian Frampton; John Walker
- Production output: film television production
- Services: Licensing

Bumper Films Ltd was a children's stop motion animation studio based in Weston-super-Mare, United Kingdom. They were best known for producing the original series of Fireman Sam, (BAFTA nominated 1987) which aired from 1987 to 1994 in the UK. They also produced Joshua Jones, which aired 1992 to 1994, Star Hill Ponies, which aired from 1998 to 2002, and Rocky Hollow, which aired from 1983 to 1987.

After finishing production on Star Hill Ponies, the company became dormant. Bumper Films retained a stake in the Fireman Sam brand when sold by owners S4C to Gullane Entertainment in December 2001.

== List of series ==
Title	Original Broadcast	Network
Rocky Hollow	1983–87	S4C
Fireman Sam	1987–94	S4C
Joshua Jones	1991	S4C
Star Hill Ponies	1998–2002	S4C
