= Robert Docker =

English composer

Robert Docker (5 June 1918 – 9 May 1992) was an English composer, arranger and pianist, especially noted for his orchestral arrangements and original light music compositions. The son of a Paddington gas worker, he was educated at North Paddington Central School, and with the aid of a London County Council Scholarship was able to study viola, piano and composition at the Royal Academy of Music. His viola professor at the RAM was James Lockyer. During World War II, he was a sergeant in the King's Royal Rifle Corps stationed in Northumberland. He was later married to the viola player Meryl Unsworth and in later life resided in Suffolk.

He was particularly noted for his orchestral arrangements. His first was broadcast in 1936 and his arrangements of popular tunes were regularly heard on BBC radio programmes such as Friday Night is Music Night (where for many years he orchestrated music for Sidney Torch) and Melodies For You. He was widely associated with the BBC Concert Orchestra and in 1990, the BBC broadcast two one-hour programmes entitled The Musical World of Robert Docker.

His lighter original compositions include the "Air and Jig" for violin, cello and piano, "Cornet Cascade" and "Jolly Roger" for brass band and "Fairy Dance Reel", "Penny Whistle Tune", "Pizzicato Minuet", "West Indian Dance", "Tabarinage" and "Scène du Bal". He also composed a number of more serious works for orchestra including Legend and Pastiche Variations for piano and orchestra, the London Rhapsody for piano and orchestra and completed another larger work, Opus 40, for the 40th Anniversary tour of the BBC Concert Orchestra just before his death in May 1992. This was premiered (posthumously) in Ipswich in August 1992.
