= Extraordinary People (1992 TV series) =

- Country of origin: United Kingdom
- Original language: English
- No. of series: 2
- No. of episodes: 7

Production
- Executive producer: Rod Caird
- Running time: 50 minutes (approx.)
- Production company: Granada Television

Original release
- Network: ITV
- Release: 10 March 1992 – 23 March 1993

Extraordinary People is a television documentary series produced by Granada Television and broadcast on the ITV network in the United Kingdom between 10 March 1992 and 23 March 1993. Each programme focused on an individual or group of people who excel in their chosen field.

The programme ran for two series, with seven episodes in total.

== Episode list ==
=== Series 1 (1992) ===
No. overall	No. in series	Title	Episode focus	Original release date
1	1	"Until Tomorrow Comes"	Anita Goulden	10 March 1992
The first episode of the series focusses on Anita Goulden, a charity worker who has worked to help the sick and abandoned children of Peru for over thirty years.
2	2	"Return To The Camps"	Pauline Cutting	17 March 1992
Part one of surgeon Dr. Pauline Cutting's visit to the Lebanon and the Gaza Strip's Palestinian refugee camps.
3	3	"Return To Gaza"	Pauline Cutting	24 March 1992
Part two of surgeon Dr. Pauline Cutting's visit to Lebanon and the Gaza Strip.
4	4	"Across The Jade Divide"	Keith Huxley	31 March 1992
Keith Huxley attempts to retrace a 2000-mile journey across China made by his father Tom Huxley in 1944.

=== Series 2 (1993) ===
No. overall	No. in series	Title	Episode focus	Original release date
5	1	"Williams: The Champions"	Williams Grand Prix Engineering	9 March 1993
A look at how the Williams Formula One team prepare for the 1993 season during the winter of 1992.
6	2	"On A Knife Edge"	Terence Lewis	16 March 1993
Heart surgeon Terence Lewis of the Royal London Hospital's work is followed, as well as the NHS in general.
7	3	"McCluskieganj"	McCluskieganj Community	23 March 1993
A look at the Anglo-Indian community of McCluskieganj in the present day Indian state of Jharkhand.
