= Theresa Plummer-Andrews =

British television producer (1944–2021)

- Born: 1 May 1944; Colindale, Barnet, Greater London, England
- Died: 31 August 2021 (aged 77); Sydenham, Greater London, England
- Citizenship: British
- Occupation: Television producer
- Employer: BBC
- Known for: Children's television

Theresa Plummer-Andrews (1 May 1944 – 31 August 2021) was a British television producer who primarily worked for Children's BBC (CBBC). She was the executive producer for The Animals of Farthing Wood, Noddy's Toyland Adventures and Bob the Builder.

== Career ==
Plummer-Andrews began her career as a theatrical agent whose clients included Richard Burton and Elizabeth Taylor. She moved to television during the 1970s, working on the show Elephant Boy with James Gatwood. As part of her duties, she learned how to combine a British-written script with location shooting in Singapore and Sri Lanka and post-production in Australia. This led to work for TVNZ and ABC Australia.

In 1981, she began work at TVS, the ITV franchise holder for Southern England, during which time she increased her focus on children's programming. This led to her moving to the BBC to become an executive producer for Children's BBC (CBBC) in 1986. As part of her work with the BBC, she helped form BBC Children's International to secure additional funding for children's programming. As co-executive producer of Animals of Farthing Wood, she had to negotiate with 18 broadcasters in 16 countries. She was subsequently promoted to head of acquisitions and creative development, in which post she helped executive produce Bob the Builder.

In 1999, Plummer-Andrews co-founded Create TV and Film, which produced the stop motion animation series Little Robots. In October 2003, she announced that she would stand down from CBBC to concentrate more on Create TV and Film.

In 2015, she served as script editor for the show Adventures in Duckport.

== Legacy ==
Plummer-Andrews was praised in the television industry for her approach to providing independent content and production organisations for the BBC. As a result of her work, the amount of externally produced content for CBBC rose to 40 per cent.

She died in August 2021 at the age of 77.
