= Physica Particularis =

Physica Particularis may refer to several Latin-language physics books:

- Institutiones physicae pars altera, seu physica particularis (Trnava/Nagyszombat 1756/1761), by Andreas Jaszlinszky
- Philosophia naturalis seu physica generalis et particularis (Vienna 1755), by Joseph Redlhamer
- Physica Particularis (Graz 1766), by Leopold Biwald
- Physica particularis (Guadalajara 18th century), essay by Francisco Javier Clavijero
- Physica Particularis (Trnava/Venice 1770/1782), by Johann Baptiste Horvath — * Physica Particularis (Vol.I+II, Paris, 1750–1754), by Pierre Lemonnier
- Secunda Secundae, sive Physica in Particulari (Lyon 1648), by Philip of the Blessed Trinity
