= Pierre Lemonnier =

Pierre Lemonnier may refer to:

- Pierre Lemonnier (physicist) (1675–1757), French physicist and astronomer
- Pierre Lemonnier (footballer) (born 1993), French footballer
