= Kazimir Bedeković Komorski =

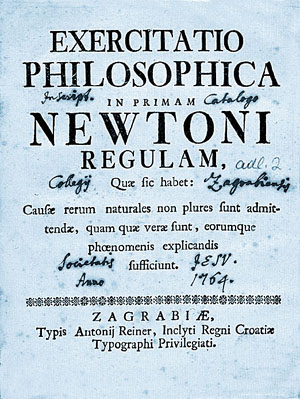
Main page of publication Exercitato Philosophica Newtoni, 1758

Kazimir Bedeković Komorski (1727‒1782) was a Croatian writer, translator and priest. He hailed from the noble family of Bedeković Komorski. He served as professor of theology, controversy and various philosophical disciplines at collegiums in Varaždin and Zagreb. He was also a canon of Zagreb from 1774.

He is primarily known for his philosophical polemic Exercitatio Philosophica in primam Newtoni regulam (Zagreb, 1758), written as a dialogue between those arguing in favor and against of Isaac Newton's views regarding natural science. The work is notable for being a departure from the classical scholastic-Aristotelian philosophy at the Zagreb Academy. It was influenced by similar publications of Andreas Jaszlinszky from Trnava.

In 1759, he published Tractatus de incertitudine scientiarum (Zagreb), a translation of Englishman Thomas Baker's Reflections upon learning.

During his tenure as rector at the Croatian College in Vienna (Collegium Croaticum, 1778–1782), he wrote and published several drama pieces in Latin. He also wrote the Historia Collegii Croatici, which remained in manuscript and is now lost.
