= Joseph Redlhamer =

Austrian physicist

Joseph Redlhamer (20 October 1713 in Lower Austria – 9 July 1761 in Vienna) was a professor at the University of Vienna.

He joined the Jesuits at age 18 and earned a doctorate in philosophy and theology, after which he taught ethics, philosophy and theology in Linz, Graz and Vienna. He was a contemporary of Johann Baptiste Horvath, Andreas Jaszlinszky and Leopold Biwald.

Among his published works is Philosophia naturalis seu physica generalis et particularis (Vienna, 1755), in two parts, for which a scanned copy of the first part (Physica Generalis) is available online. Physica Generalis deals primarily with mechanics, including fluid mechanics and gravity.

He was also a noted Catholic theologian and philosopher who published several other books.
