= Johann Baptiste Horvath =

Slovak Professor of Physics and Philosophy (1732–1799)

Johann Baptiste Horvath (Hungarian: Keresztély János Horváth, 13 July 1732 in Kőszeg – 20 October 1799 in Buda) was a Hungarian Jesuit Professor of Physics and Philosophy at the Catholic university for teaching theology and philosophy in Nagyszombat, Kingdom of Hungary (now Trnava, Slovakia). He is most noted for his authorship of various textbooks.

== Biography ==
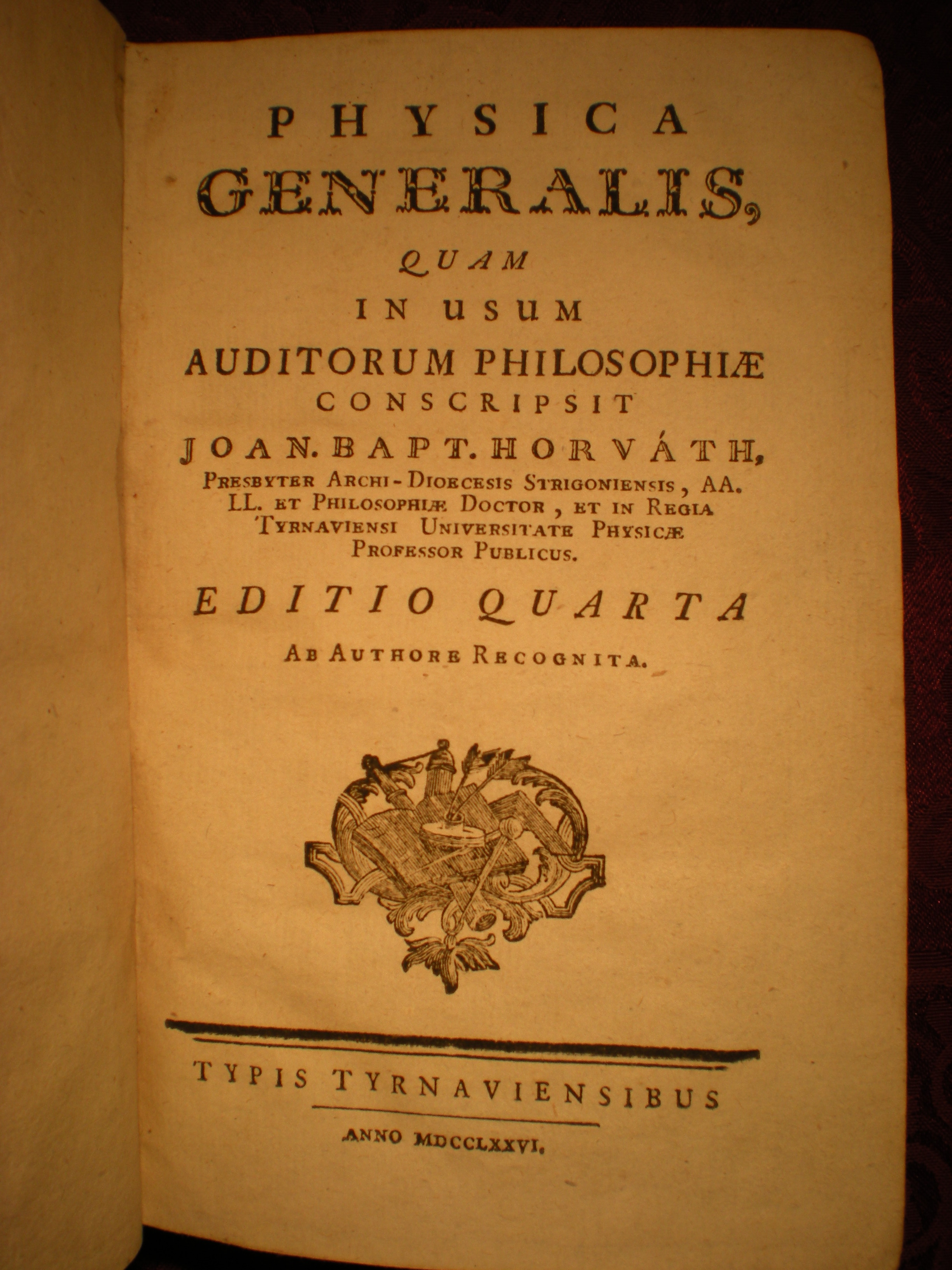
Physica Generalis (1776).

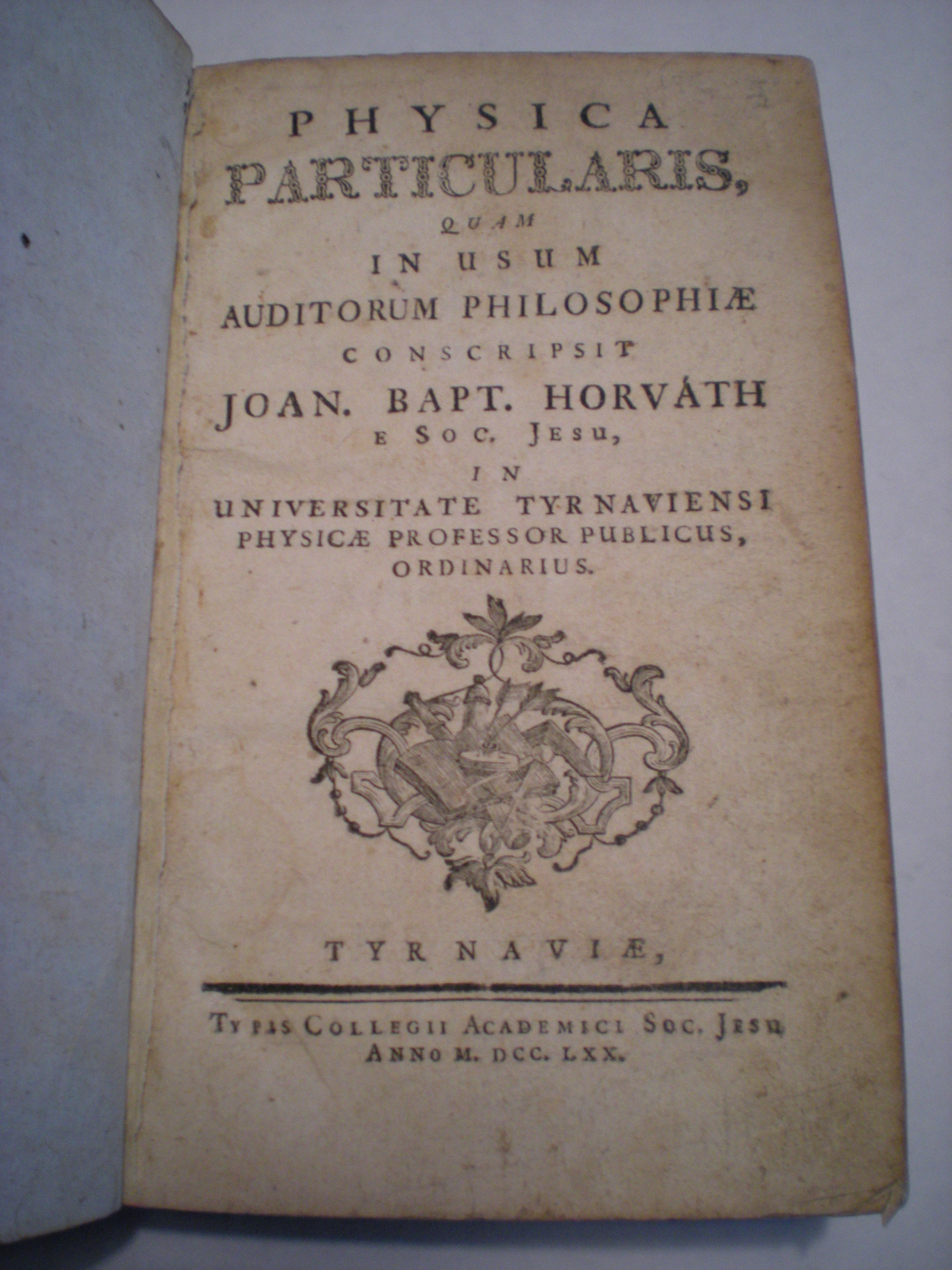
Physica Particularis (1770).

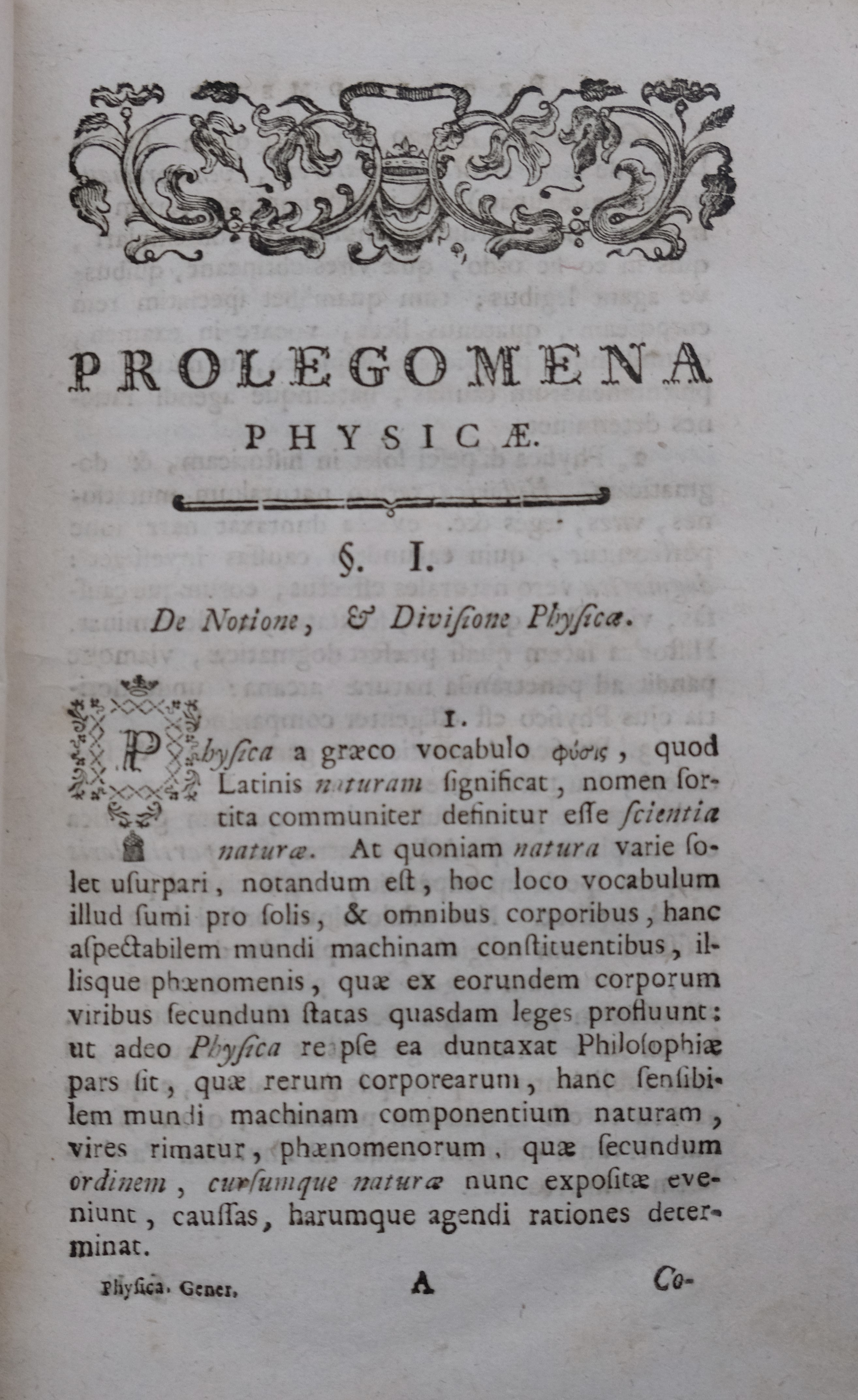
Prologue to a 1776 copy of Physica Generalis

Horvath entered the Jesuit order at 19 years of age (17 October 1751) in Trencsén (Trenčín), became a university professor, and subsequently authored the well-known Latin textbooks Physica Generalis (1767/1782, 496pp) and Physica Particularis (1770/1782, 472pp). Various other works are attributed to Horvath, including Elementa Physicae (1790/1807/1819, 656pp) which is a condensed revision of Physica Generalis and Physica Particularis, Institutiones Logicae (1767/1813, 118pp), Elementa/Institutiones Matheseos (1772/1782, 456pp), Institutiones Metaphysicae (1767/1817, 362pp) and Declaratio Infirmitatis Fundamentorum (1797, 188pp) which is a philosophical text regarding speculations on the nature of God posited by Immanuel Kant. This collection of works, including metaphysics/logic and physics, was typical of Jesuit academics teaching under the Ratio Studiorum (1599). The books were published in Nagyszombat (Hungary), Augsburg (Germany), Eger and Buda (Hungary), Velencze (Principality of Transylvania), Madrid (Spain), Vienna (Austria) and Venice and Turin (Italy), including multiple editions and/or printings of each volume.

Physica Generalis deals primarily with classical mechanics and celestial mechanics, for example including a Copernican (heliocentric) diagram of the Solar System, missing Uranus and Neptune, and a diagram of a highly-elliptical comet. Physica Particularis includes treatments of fluid mechanics, heat transfer and optics, and several chapters deal scientifically with the nascent field of electricity, where Horvath is thought to be the first Central European author to present electricity and magnetism in the same chapter. The coverage is eclectic, including topics like the aurora borealis, combustion, sound, rainbows, botany and lightning. The work is also notable for its reliance on experimental physics, since this branch of physics was still emerging as a reputable field, especially among Jesuit academics. For example, Horvath cites experiments on electricity by Benjamin Franklin (1754). In addition to his physics textbooks, Horvath published the mathematics textbook Institutiones Matheseos, including sections covering arithmetic, algebra, geometry, trigonometry and conic sections.

He was among the most important Central European physics textbook authors in the 18th century (see also Andreas Jaszlinszky as well as Leopold Biwald and Joseph Redlhamer), and an innovative proponent of Newtonian mechanics, which in hindsight was the correct theory rather than the Cartesian mechanics popular among some Continental philosophers. By promoting the methods of Copernicus and Newton, influenced by the approach of Borgondio and Boscovich, Horvath represents a (correct) departure from "accepted" thinking in that region of Europe, and his works were widely distributed. He continued to publish and instruct students from a secular professorship after the Jesuit order was suppressed in 1773, and during his tenure the university faculty moved to modern-day Hungary (1777) to become the renowned University of Budapest.

Full-text scanned versions of Physica Particularis (1782/1775/1770/1817), missing some pages and illustrated plates, are available online. Similarly, scanned copies of Physica Generalis (1780/1775/1772) are available online. Images of the textbook title pages are also available. Each of these textbooks is worth approximately $150 depending on condition.

== Plates (7) from Physica Generalis (1776) ==
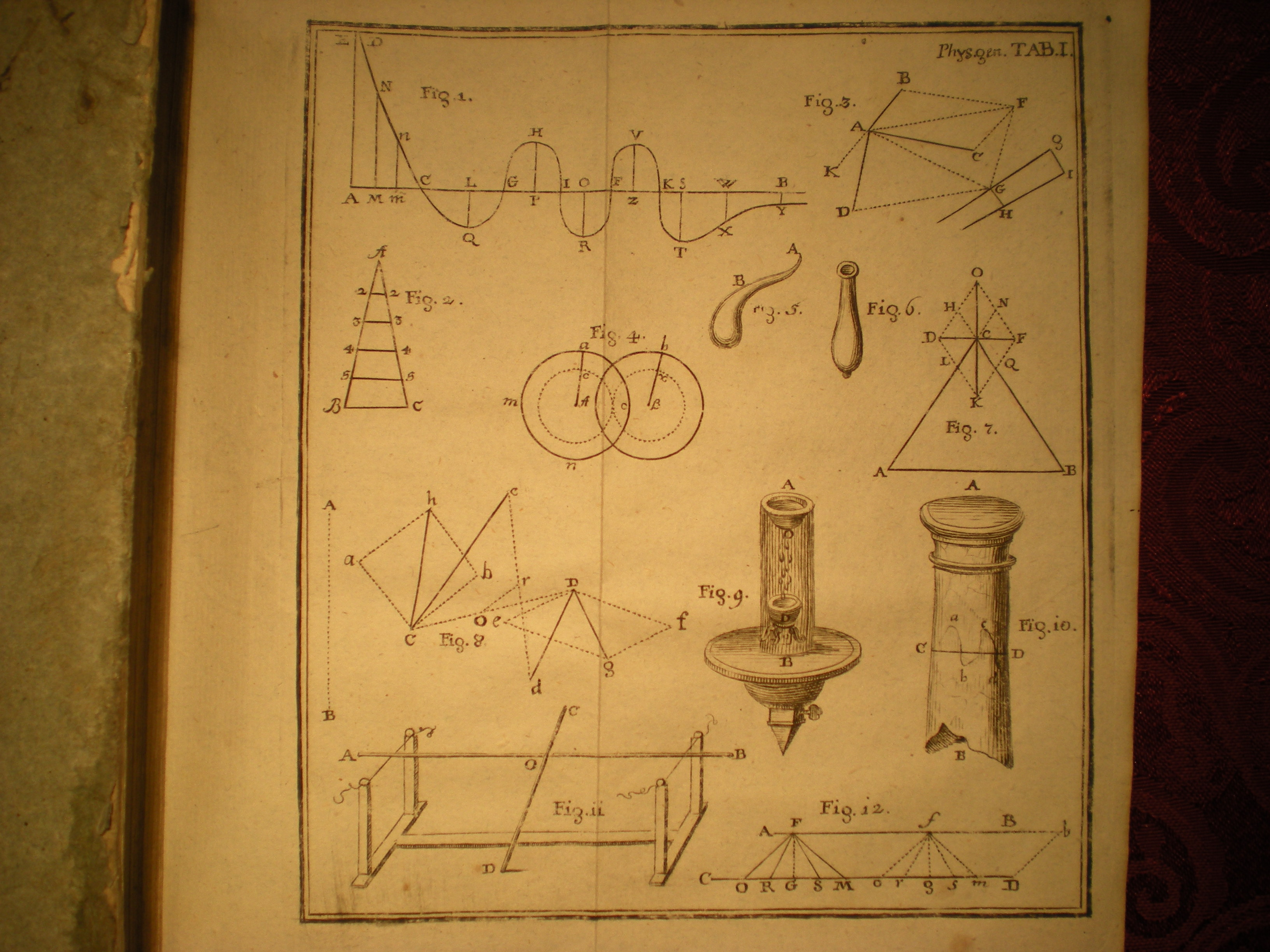
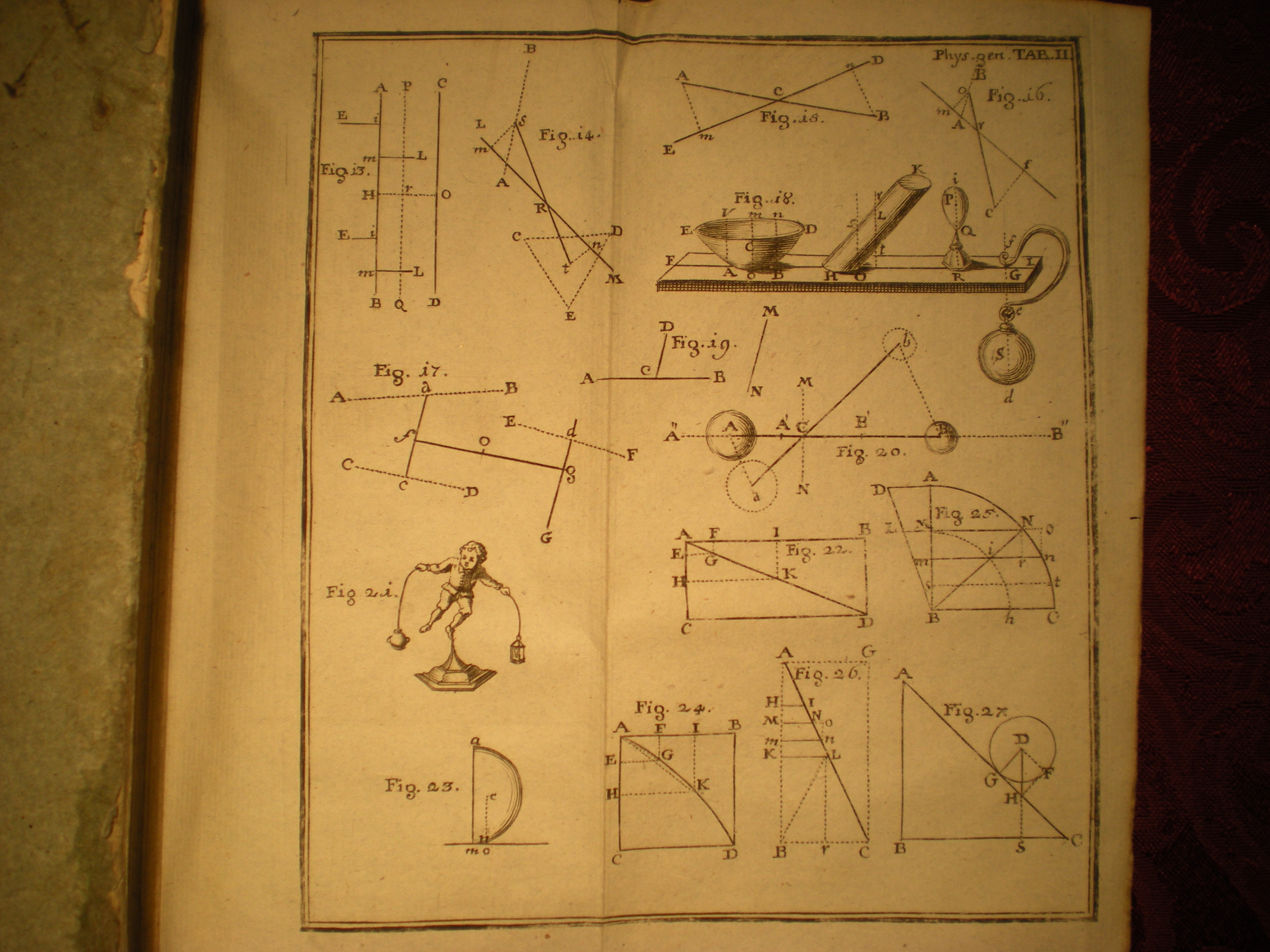
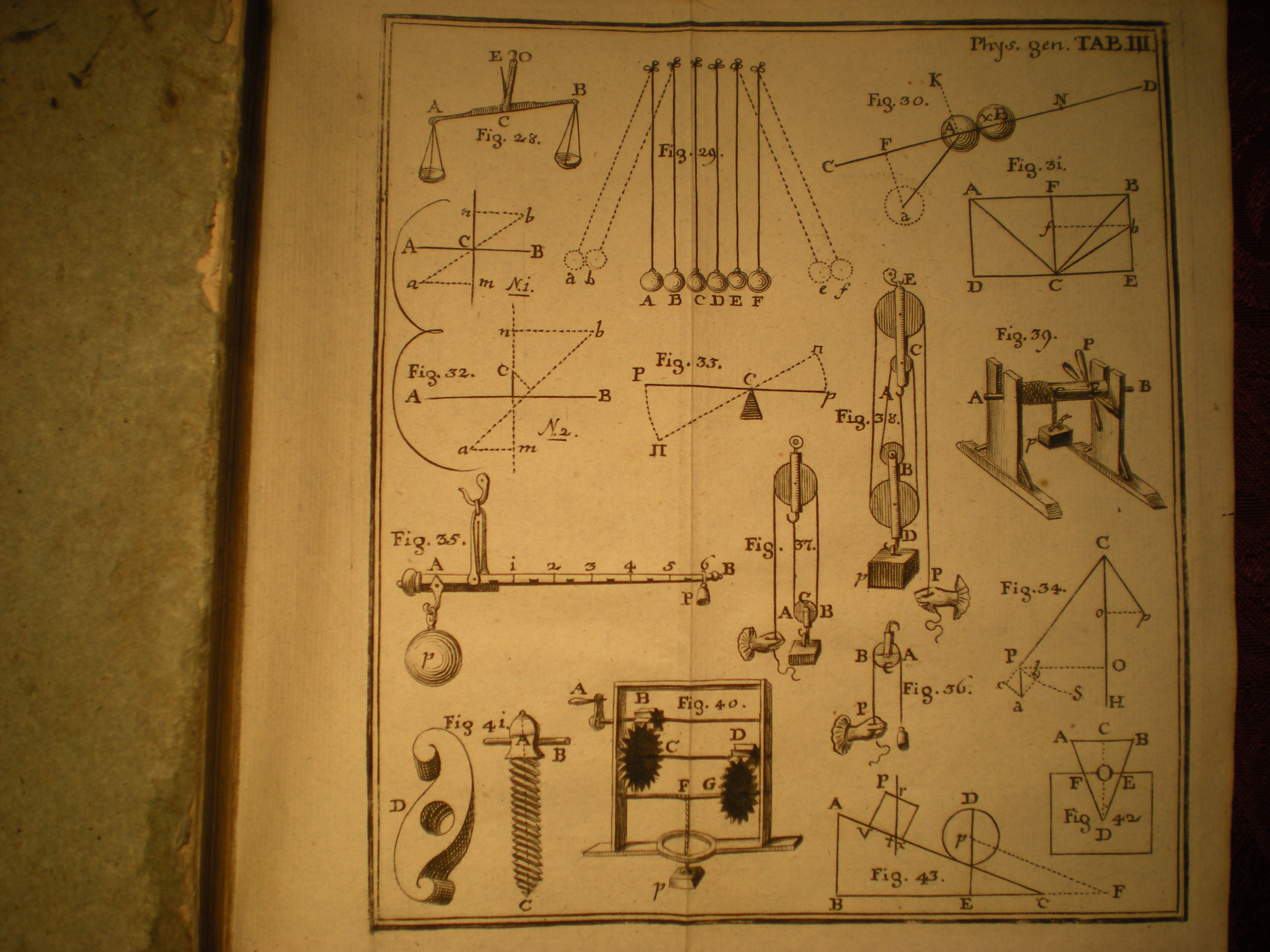
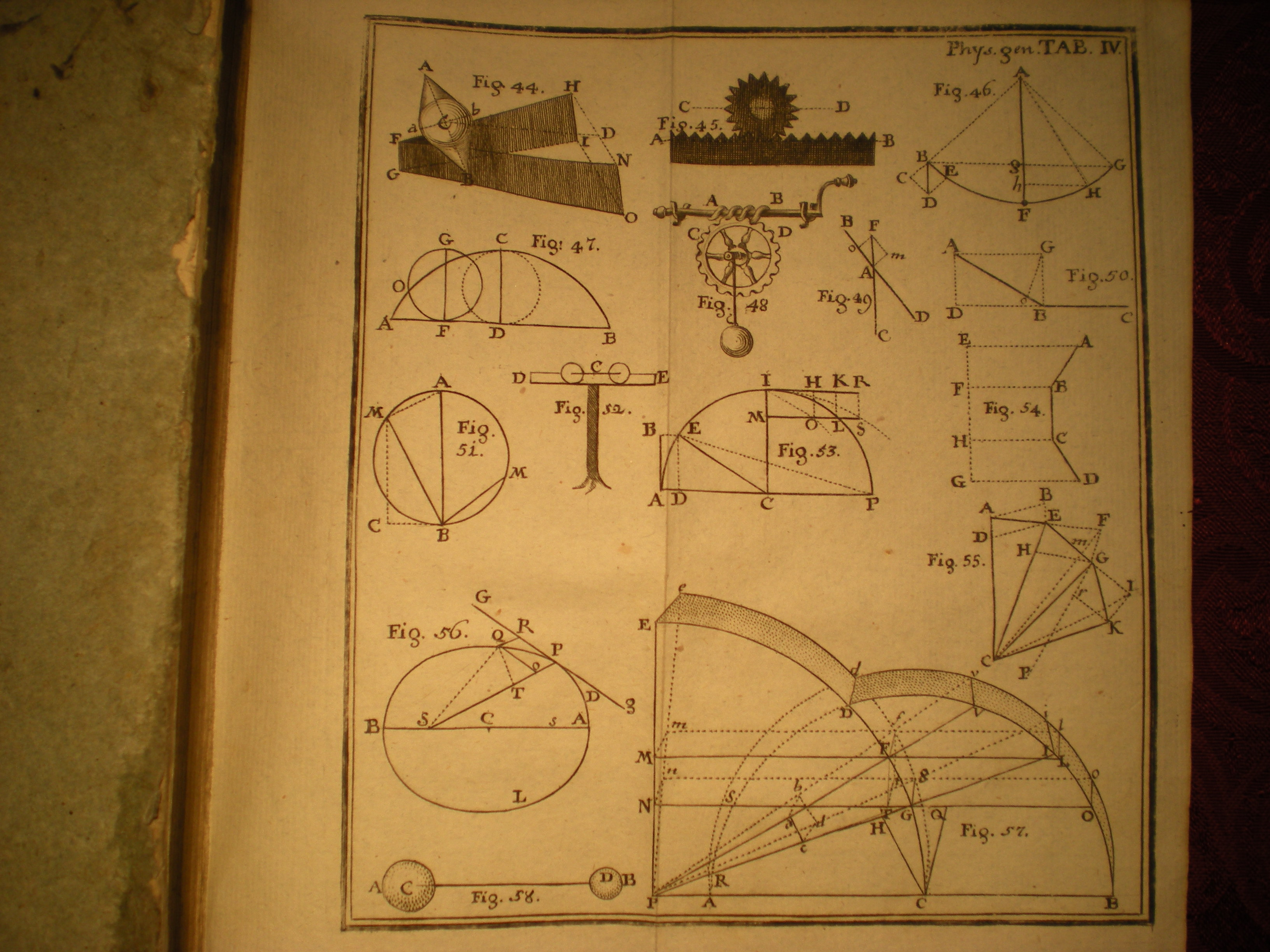
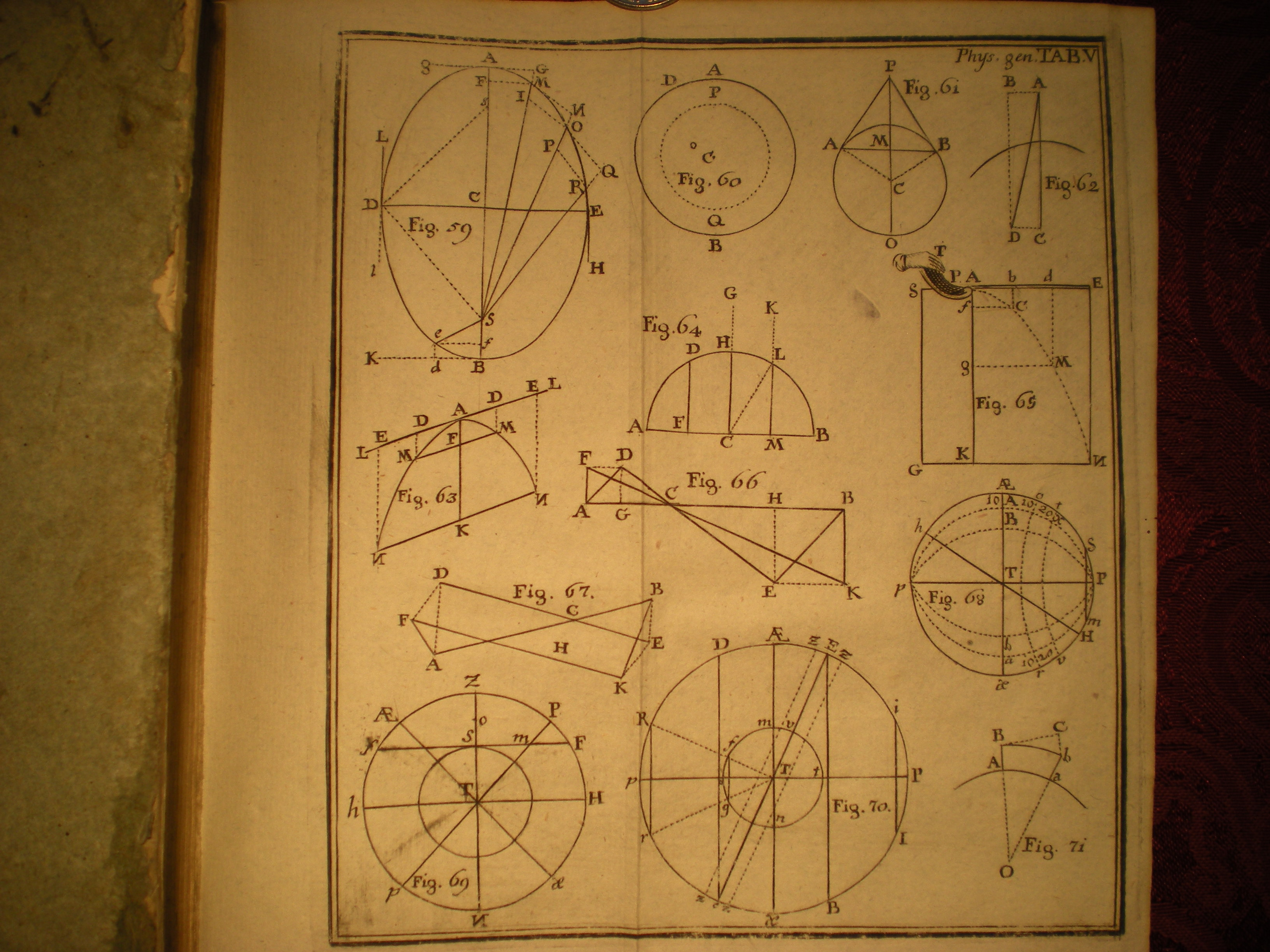
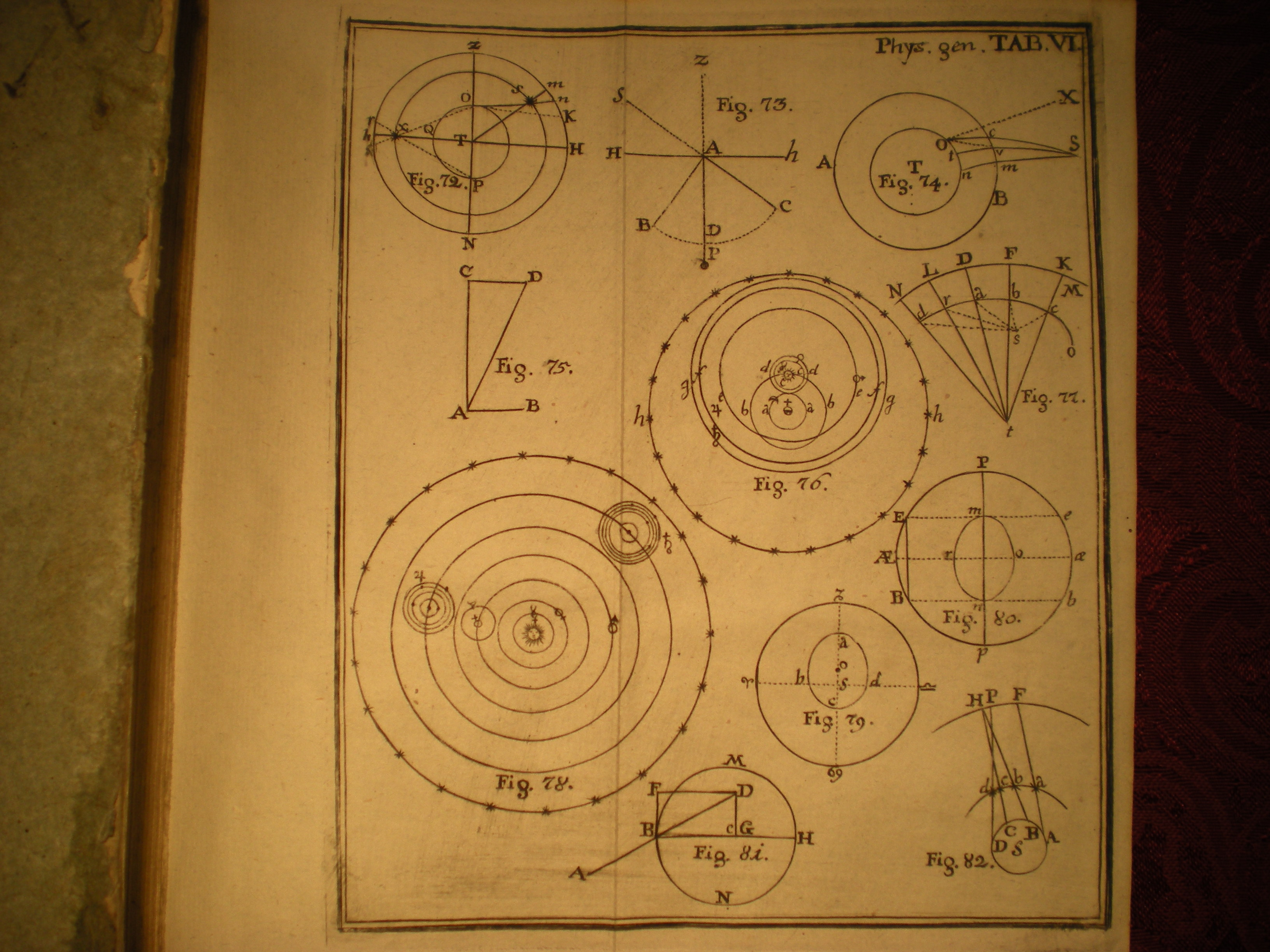
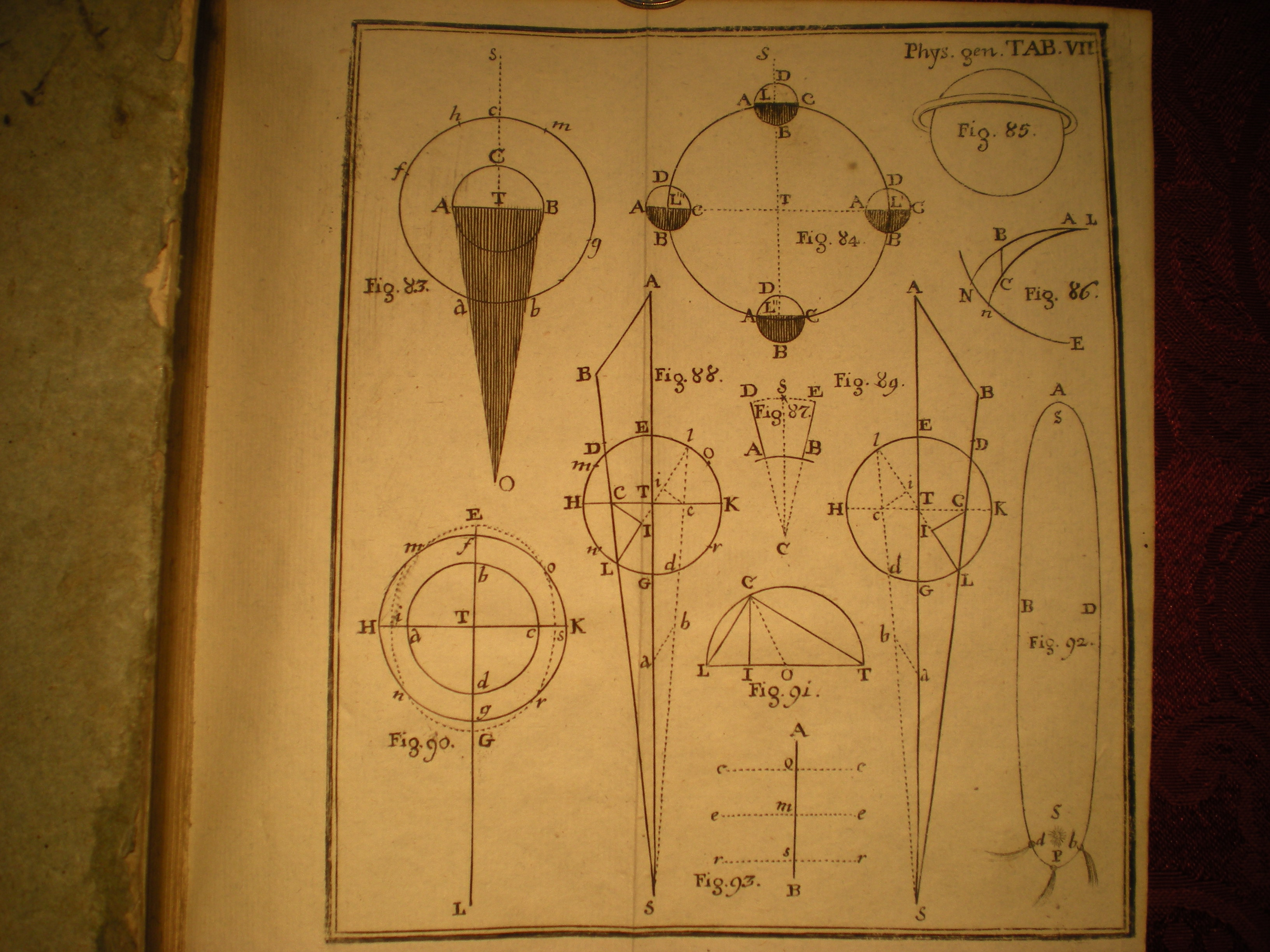

== Plates (8) from Physica Particularis (1770) ==
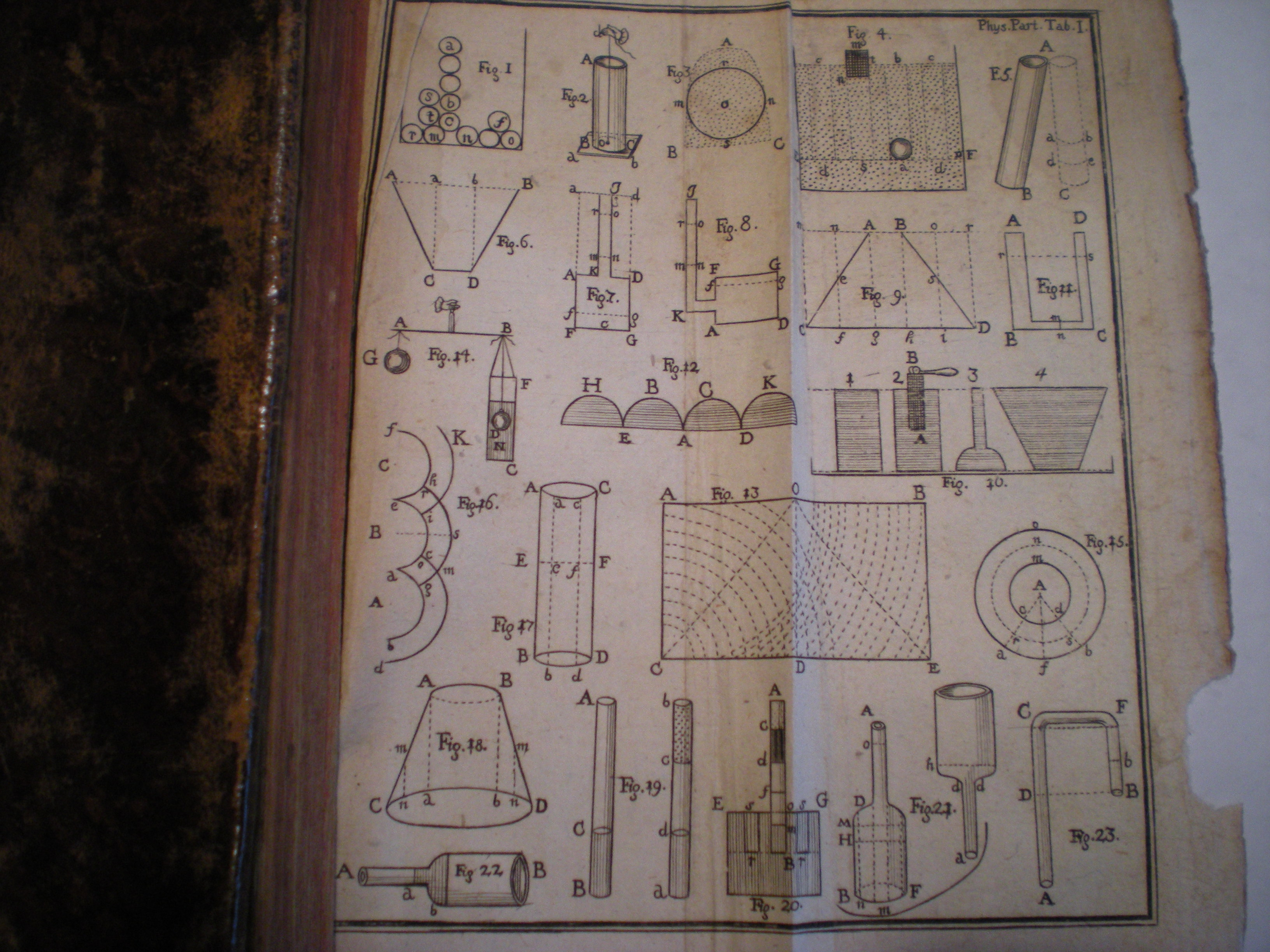
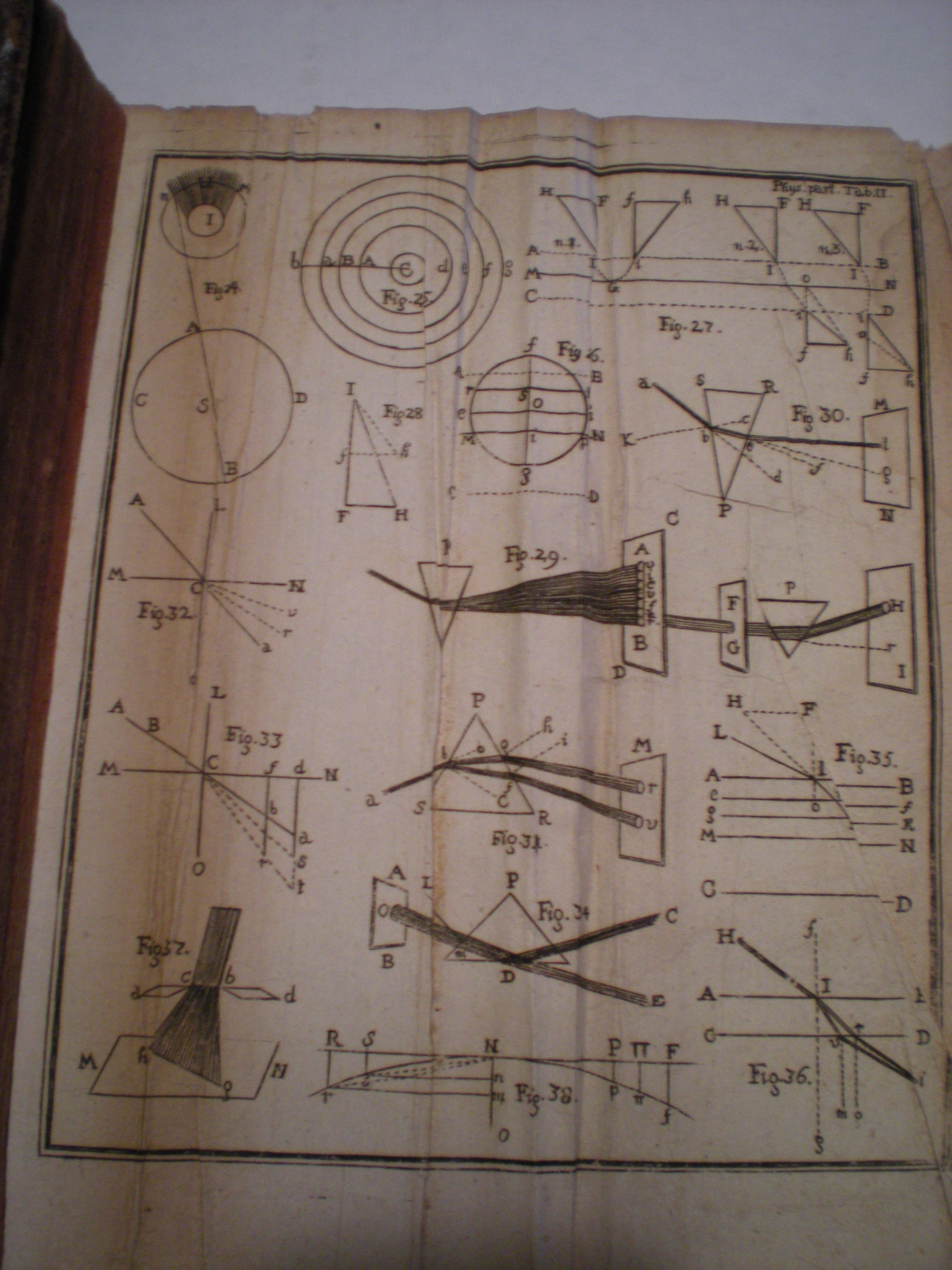
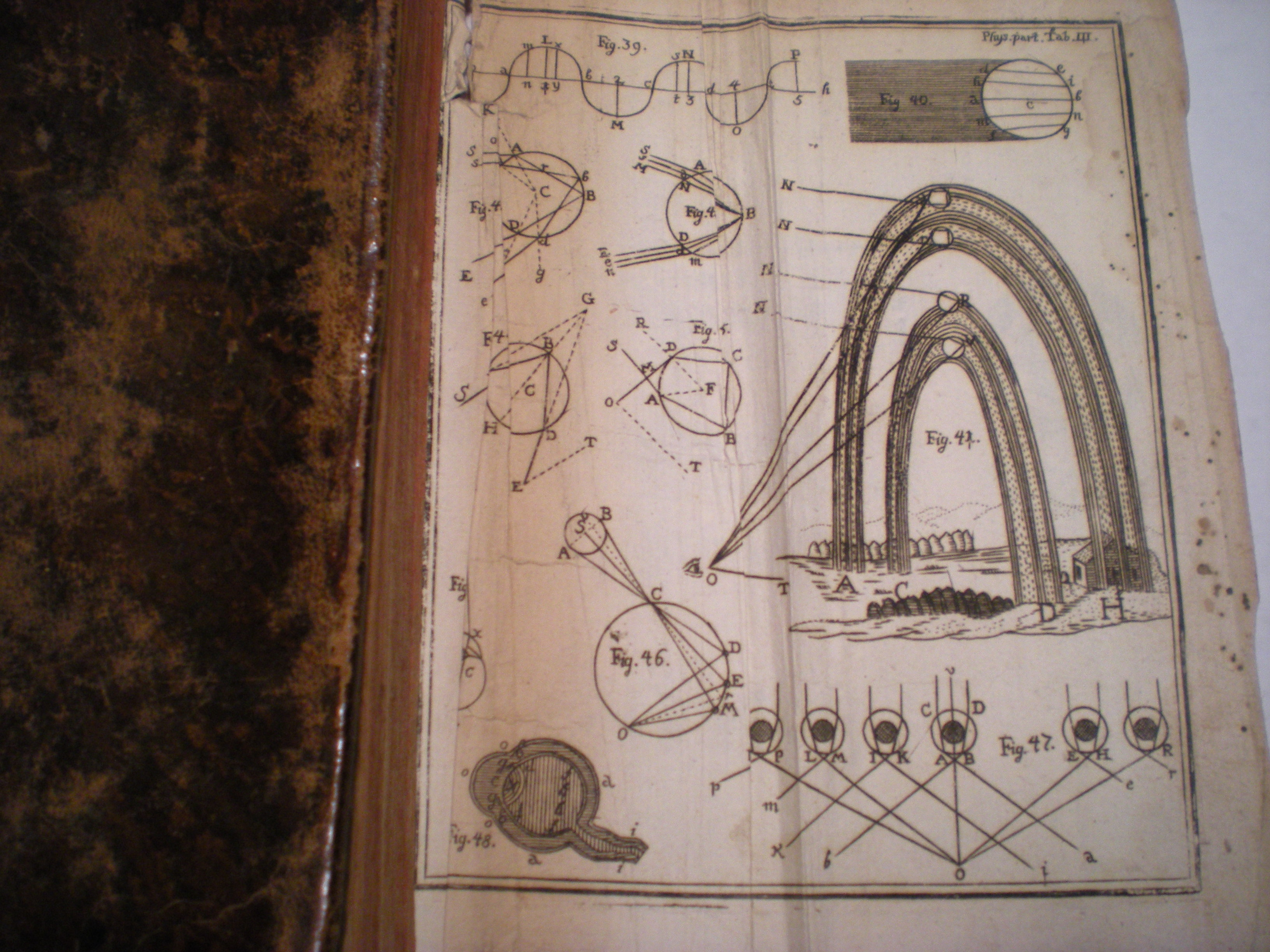
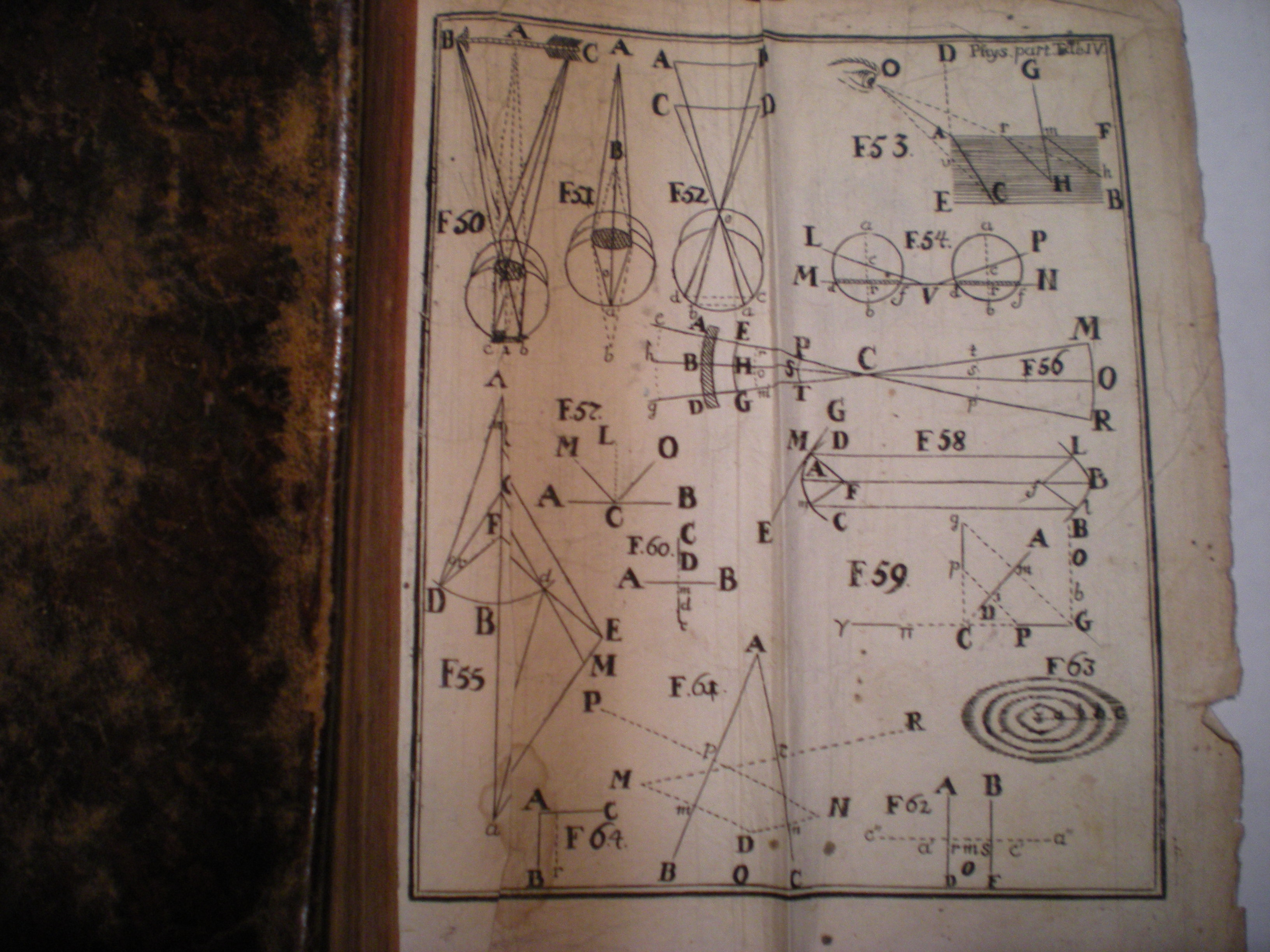
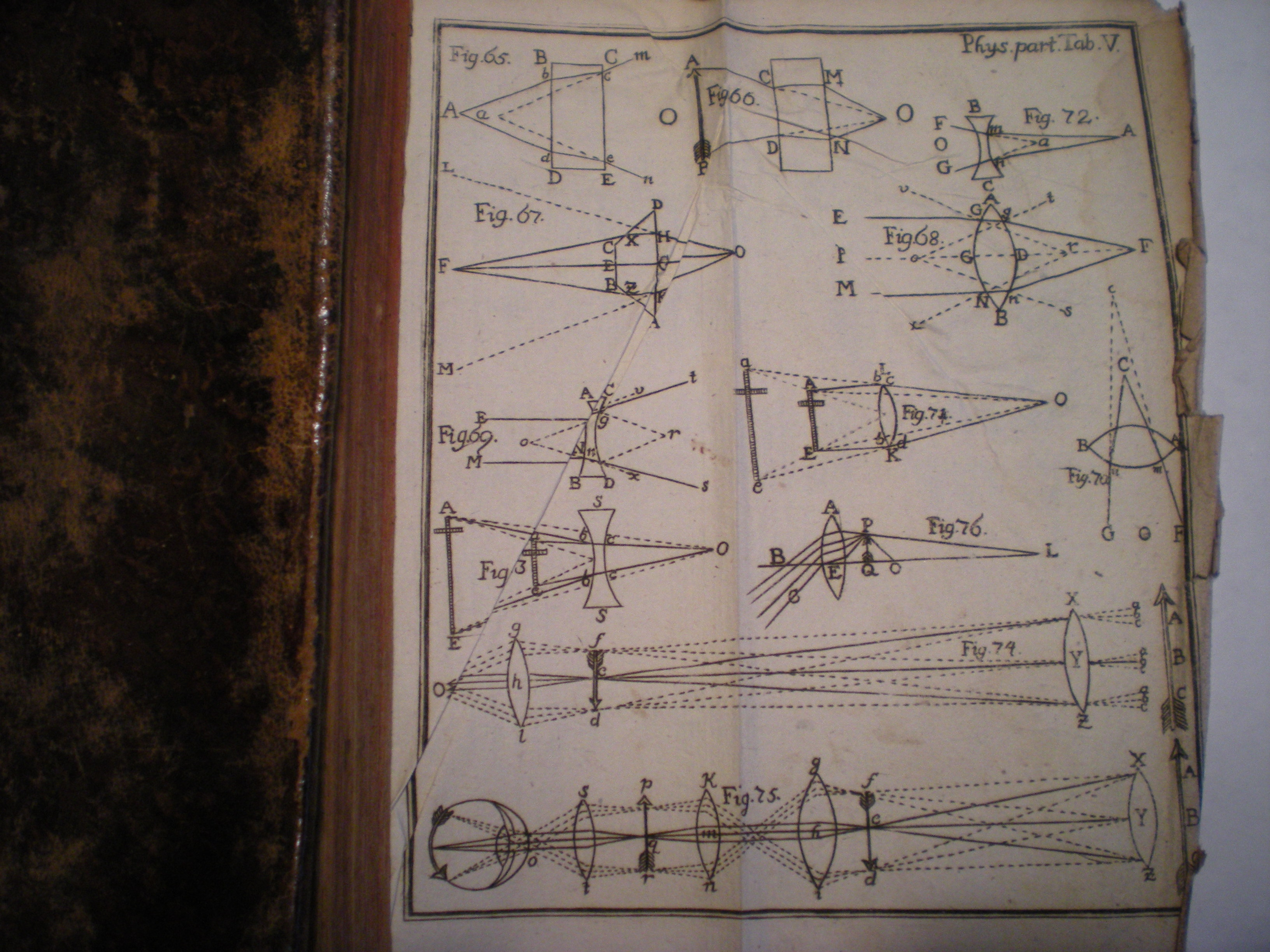
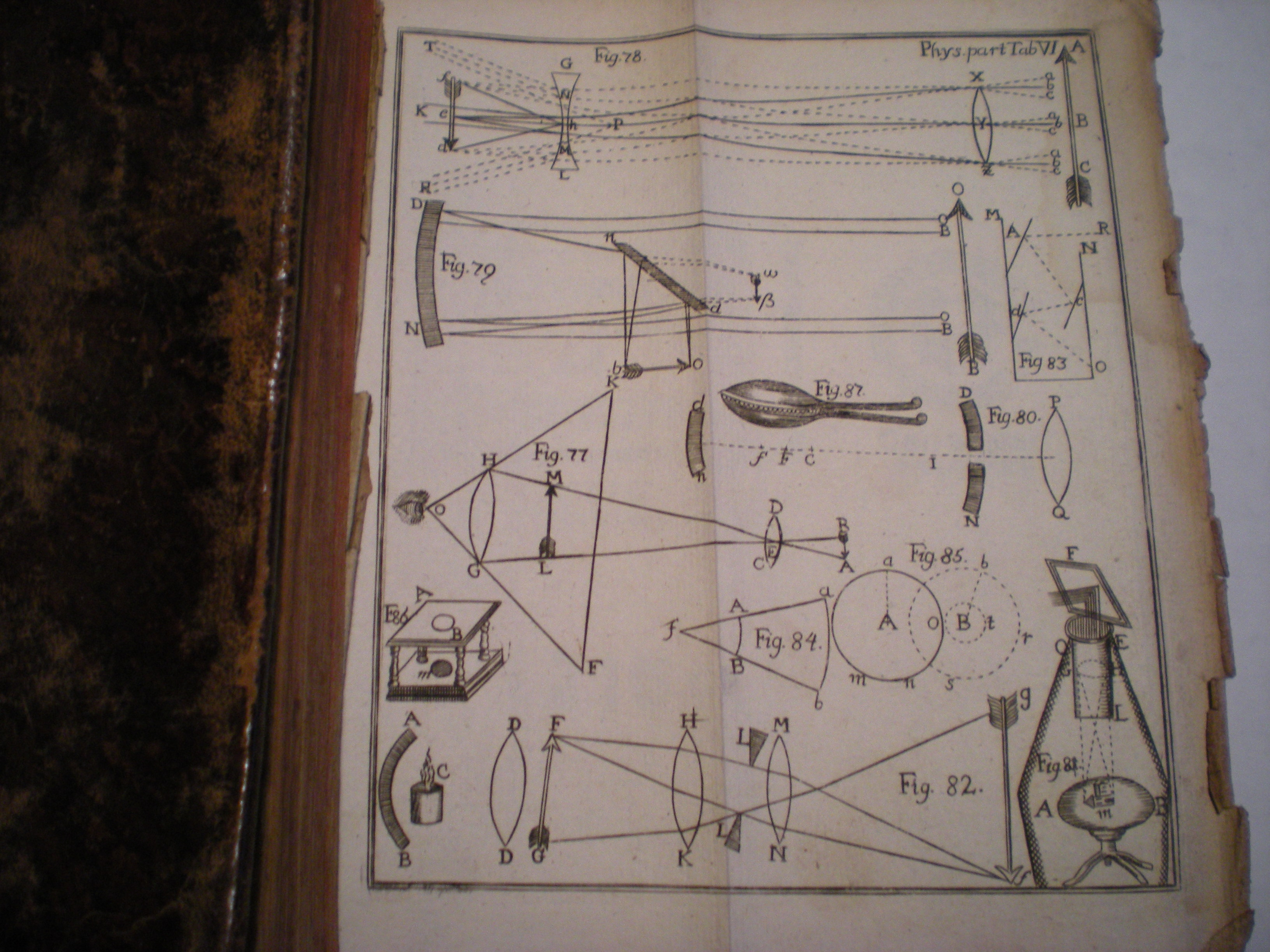
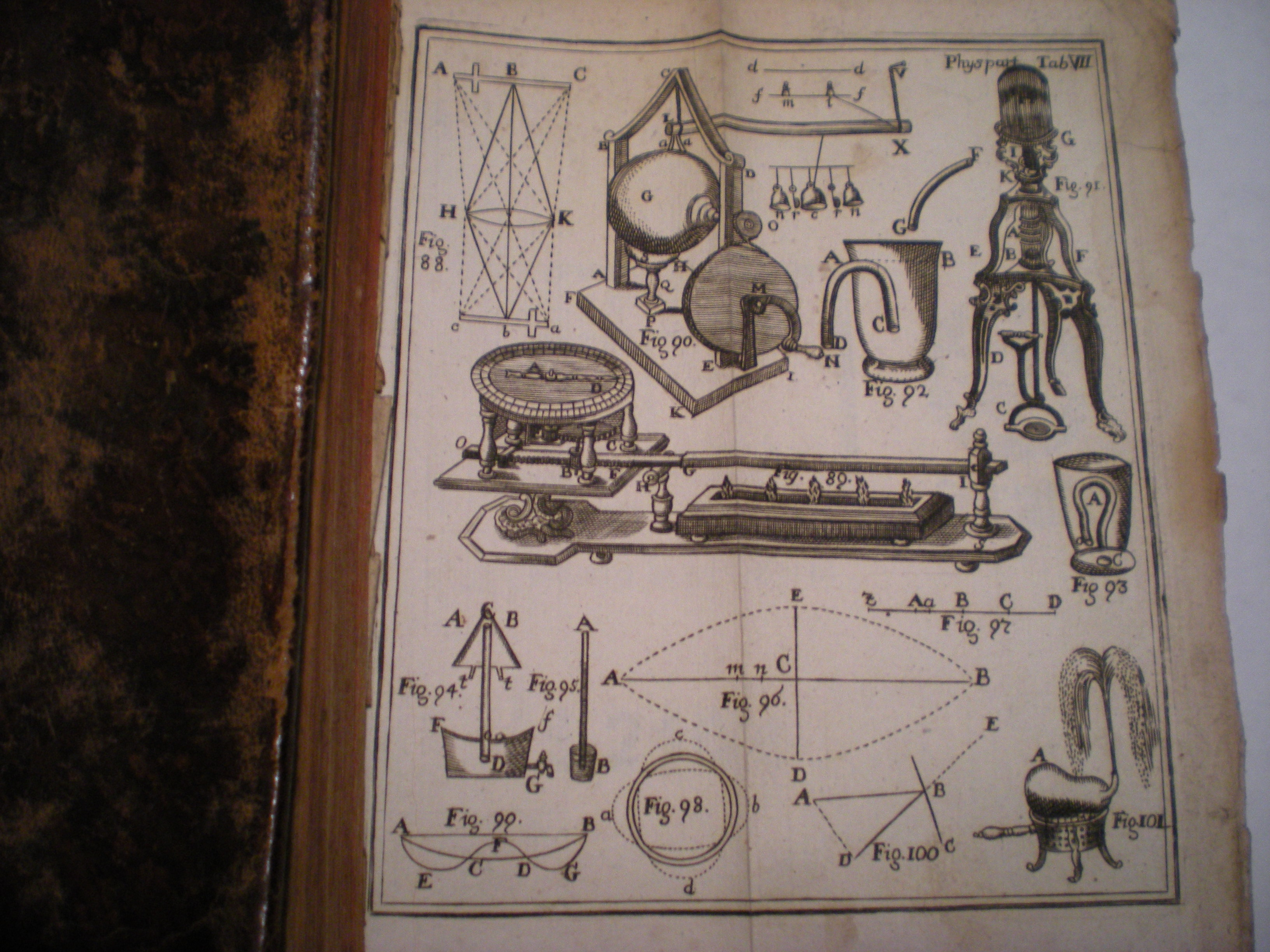
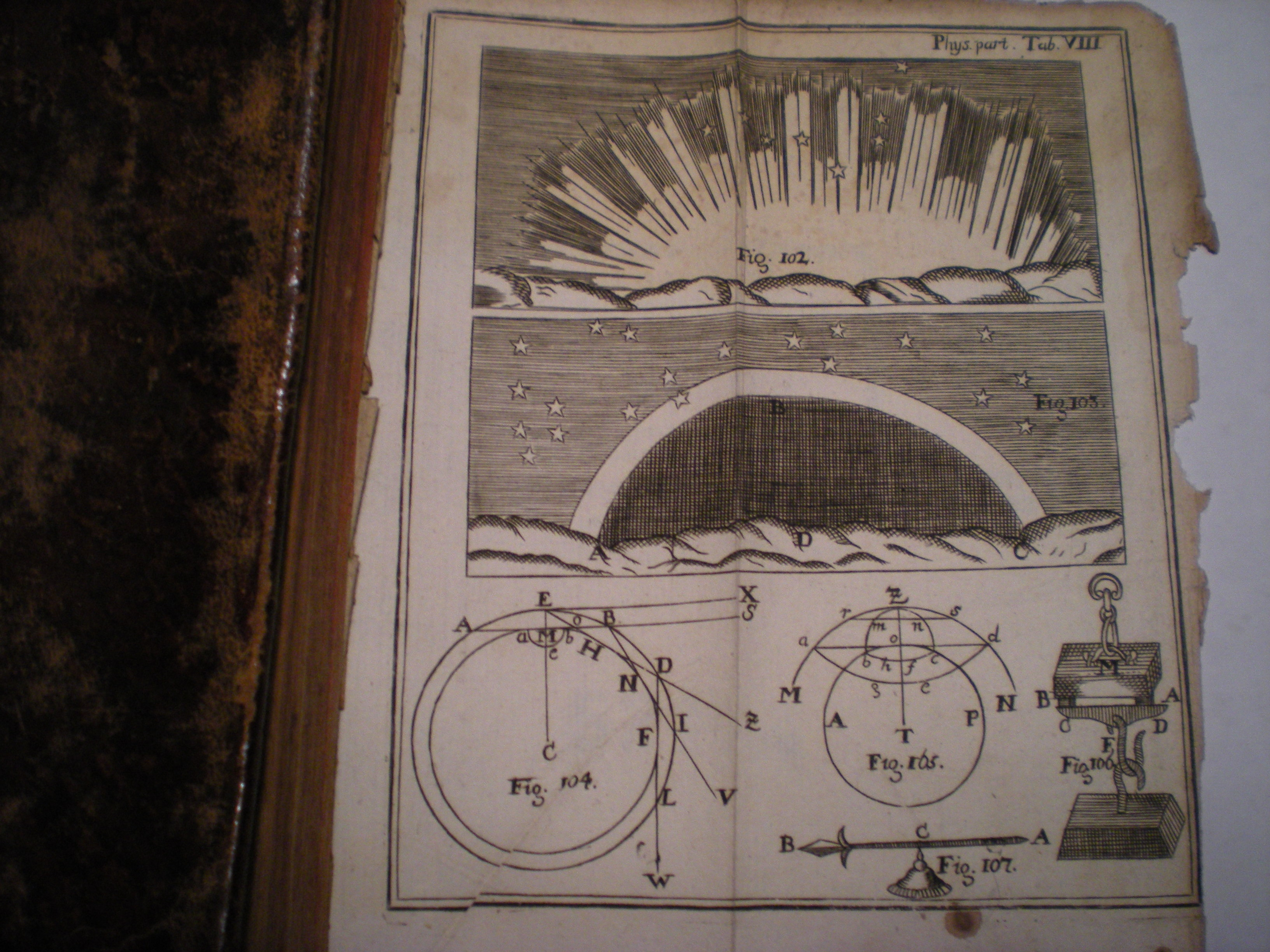

== See also ==
- Andreas Jaszlinszky
- Edmond Pourchot
- Pierre Lemonnier
- Philip of the Blessed Trinity
- Charles Morton

== Appendix ==
An example of near-contemporary notes regarding one of these textbooks is given below, where the reader is attempting to derive Prop 280 from Physica Generalis, involving the force on a body in a circular orbit. The antiquated nomenclature includes [c = velocity] and [v = force] with [t = period] being normalized by 2π.

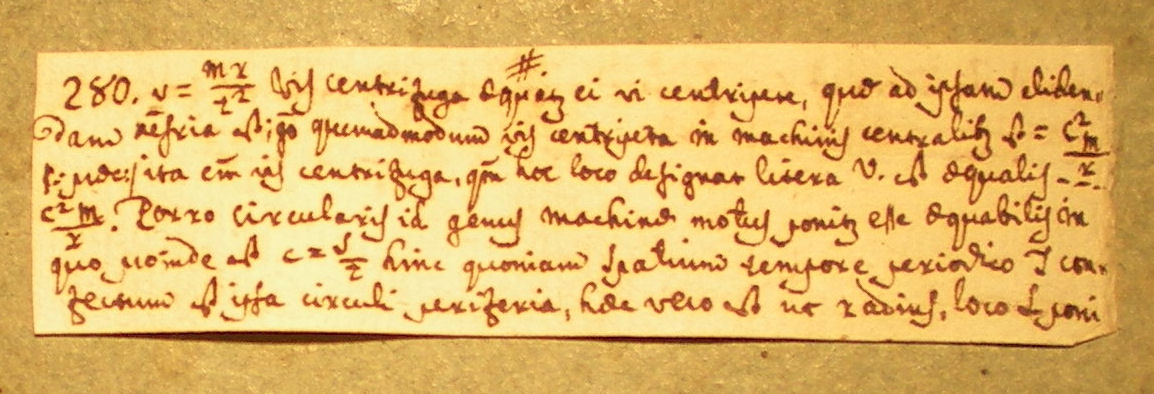
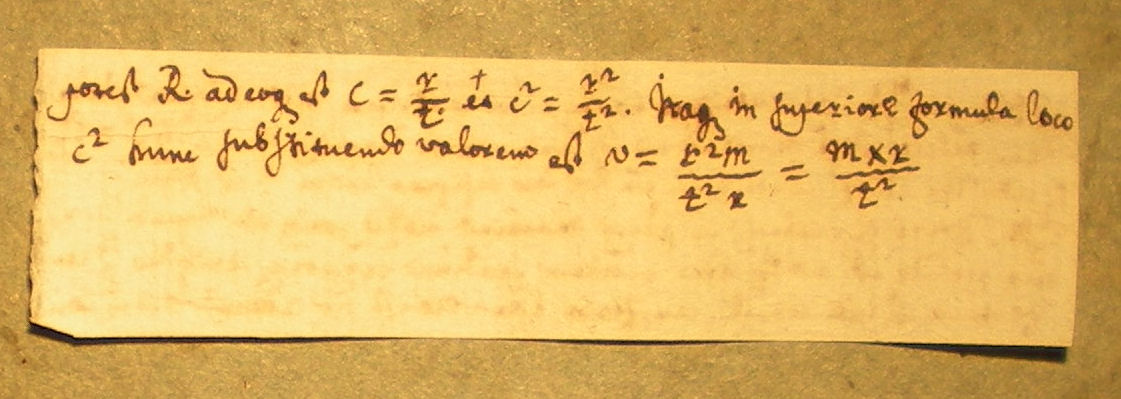
