= Leopold Biwald =

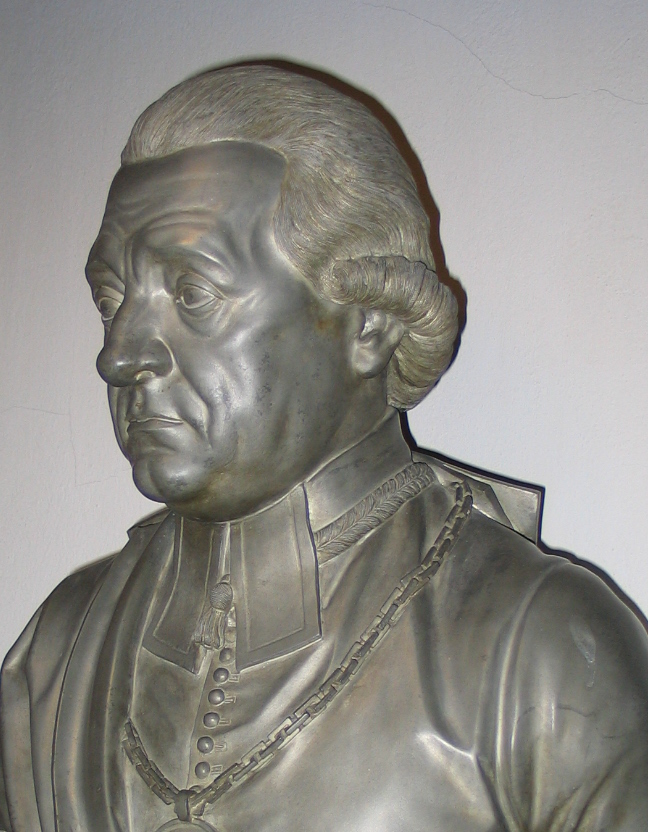
Bust of Leopold Biwald by J. M. Fischer (1807)

Leopold Gottlieb Biwald (February 26, 1731 in Vienna – September 8, 1805 in Graz) was a professor at the University of Graz.

At the age of sixteen Biwald joined the Jesuits. He became teacher of rhetoric at a secondary school in Laibach and graduated as Dr. theol. in 1761. He became professor of logic and soon afterwards of physics at the University of Graz. In 1786-1787 and again 1798-1799 he was rector of the University of Graz.

His Latin physics textbooks included Physica Generalis (1760s, 460pp), dealing with mechanics including celestial mechanics, and Physica Particularis (1760s, 403pp), dealing with diverse topics including optics. Physica Particularis was also widely distributed throughout Austria-Hungary (in modified form) as Institutiones Physicae (1779, 349pp). He was a contemporary of Johann Baptiste Horvath, Andreas Jaszlinszky and Joseph Redlhamer.

His bust, made in 1807 by Johann Martin Fischer, is now displayed in the main reading room of the University Library of Graz.

== Works ==
- Theoria philosophiae naturalis, redacta ad unam legem virium in natura existentium auctore J. R. Boscovich S. J. ab ipso perpolita et aucta. Ex prima Editione Veneta com Catalogo operum ejus ad annum 1763. Graz 1765
- De objectivi Micrometri usu in Planetarum diametris metiendis. Exercitatio optico-astronomica habita in Coll. P. P. S. J. Rome 1765; Graz 1768.
- Physica generalis et particularis quam auditorium philosophiae usibus accomodavit Leopoldus Biwald etc. etc. Graz 1766; 2nd ed. 1769; 3rd ed. 1774. (At that time a very popular textbook of physics)
- Selectae ex amoenitatibus academicis Caroli Linnaei dissertationes ad universam naturalem historiam pertinentes, quas edidit et additamentis auxit L. B. e. S. J. Graz 1764
- Disseratatio de studii physici perpetuis mediis et cum scientiis reliquis nexu. 1767

== Literature ==
- Biographisches Lexikon des Kaiserthums Oesterreich Vol. I. 1856.
