= Philip of the Blessed Trinity =

French Discalced Carmelite theologian and missionary

Philip of the Blessed Trinity (1603 at Malaucene, near Avignon – 28 February 1671 at Naples) was a French Discalced Carmelite theologian and missionary.

== Life ==
He took the habit at Lyon where he made his profession on 8 September 1621. Choosing the missionary life, he studied in Paris and two years at the seminary in Rome, proceeded in February 1629 to the Holy Land and Persia, and then to Goa where he became prior of the Order convent and teacher of philosophy and theology (1631–1639). After the martyrdom of his pupil Dionysius, a Nativitate, and Redemptus a Cruce on 29 November 1638, Philip collected evidence and set out for Rome in 1639 to introduce the cause of their beatification which, however, only terminated in 1900.

He did not return to the mission, but starting in 1641 was entrusted with important offices in France, and in 1665 was elected Superior General of the Order with residence in Rome, and was three years later re-elected. While visiting all the provinces of his order, he was caught in a terrific gale off the coast of Calabria, and reached Naples in dying condition.

== Works ==
Besides the classical languages he spoke fluently French, Italian, Spanish, Portuguese, Persian, and Arabic. Of his numerous works the following have lasting value:

- Summa philosophica, 4 vol, (Lyon, 1648; Cologne, 1654; Cologne, 1665; Lyon, 1669), in which he follows not only the spirit but also the method of St. Thomas Aquinas

1. Prima Pars, sive Logica
2. Prima Secundae, sive Physica in Communi (Aristotelian physics)
3. Secunda Secundae, sive Physica in Particulari (Aristotelian physics and Ptolemaic astronomy including tabulated geocentric values of the distances from the Earth to the Moon and the Sun within 5% of modern heliocentric values, but a value of the circumference of the Earth within only 30% of the modern value)
4. Tertia Pars, sive Metaphysica

- Summa theologiae thomisticae, 5 vol, Lyon, 1653
- Summa theologiae mysticae, Lyon, 1656; reprinted in 3 vol, Paris, 1884
- Itinerarium orientale, Lyon, 1649, also in Italian and French
- Decor Carmeli religiosi, Lyon, 1665, the lives of the saints and saintly members of his Order
- Theologia carmelitana, Rome, 1665

The two last named and some smaller works dealing to some extent with historical matters of a controversial nature, called forth a reply from Pierre-Joseph de Haitze, under the titles "Des Moines empruntéz" and "Des Moines travestis".

== See also ==
- Johann Baptiste Horvath
- Andreas Jaszlinszky
- Edmond Pourchot
- Pierre Lemonnier
- Charles Morton
