= Pierre Lemonnier (physicist) =

Cartesian planetary vortices, Physica Particularis, 1754.

Pierre Lemonnier (French pronunciation: [pjɛʁ ləmɔnje]; aka Petro Lemonnier; 28 June 1675 in Saint-Sever, Province of Normandy – 27 November 1757 in Saint-Germain-en-Laye) was a French astronomer, a professor of Physics and Philosophy at the Collège d'Harcourt (University of Paris), and a member of the French Academy of Sciences.

Lemonnier published the 6-volume Latin university textbook Cursus philosophicus ad scholarum usum accommodatus (Paris, 1750/1754) which consisted of the following volumes (generally consistent with the Ratio Studiorum):

- Volume 1 - Logica
- Volume 2 - Metaphysica
- Volume 3 - Physica Generalis including mechanics and geometry
- Volume 4 - Physica Particularis (Part I) including astronomy (Ptolemaic, Copernican, Tychonic), optics, chemistry, gravity, and Newtonian versus Cartesian dynamics
- Volume 5 - Physica Particularis (Part II) including fluid mechanics, human anatomy, magnetism, and miscellaneous subjects (earthquakes, electricity, botany, metallurgy, etc. ...)
- Volume 6 - Moralis including appendices on trigonometry and sundials

He was also the father of Pierre Charles Le Monnier and Louis-Guillaume Le Monnier.

== See also ==
- Johann Baptiste Horvath
- Andreas Jaszlinszky
- Edmond Pourchot
- Philip of the Blessed Trinity
- Charles Morton
