= Andreas Jaszlinszky =

Slovakian physicist and author

Andreas Jaszlinszky (September 1715 – January 1783) was an early physics textbook author from the areas of the Kingdom of Hungary in today's Slovakia. His works included Institutiones physicae pars prima, seu physica generalis (Trnava/Nagyszombat, 1756/1761, 471 pp) and Institutiones physicae pars altera, seu physica particularis (Trnava/Nagyszombat, 1756/1761, 341 pp).

== Biography ==
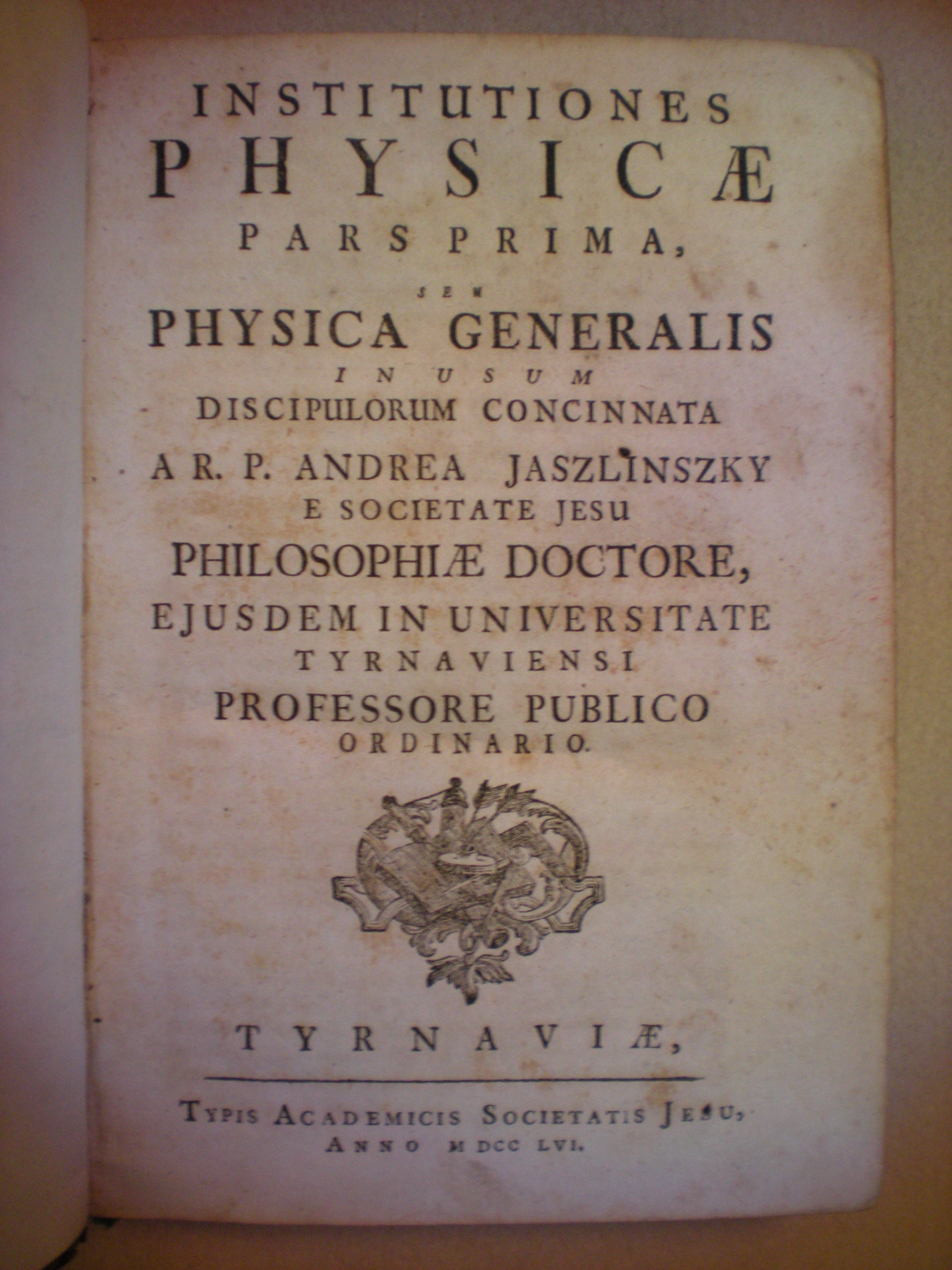
Physica Generalis (1756).

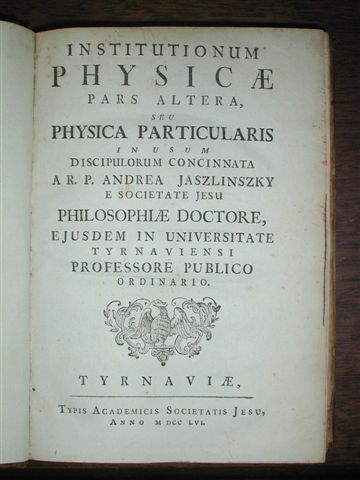
Physica Particularis (1756).

Jaszlinszky was born in September 1715 in Abaújszina (Kingdom of Hungary, modern-day Slovakia). He joined the Jesuits (October 1733 in Trenčín) and published his physics textbooks as a professor at the University of Trnava, where he taught philosophy, metaphysics, history, ethics, physics and theology. At that time, the University of Trnava was one of the major Jesuit universities in Eastern Europe (and the only university in the Kingdom of Hungary), along with Braunsberg, Lemberg, Vilnius, and Prague. Publication of Physica Generalis and Physica Particularis occurred in response to a 1753 order from Maria Theresa (Habsburg ruler in Vienna) requiring every professor to write textbooks instead of dictating lecture notes, which created a surge of works by Adanyi, Jaszlinszky, Reviczky, Radics, and Horvath. Jaszlinszky became rector of the university in 1771, and after the Suppression of the Society of Jesus in 1773, he became canon in Rozsnyó. He was a contemporary of Johann Baptiste Horvath, Leopold Biwald, and Joseph Redlhamer. He died in January 1783 in Rozsnyó.

These Latin physics textbooks each contain eight plates with descriptions and images of a variety of contemporary physics devices including manometers (fluid statics), lenses/prisms (refraction), and various simple machines. Coverage of electricity is relatively sparse, although many other diverse topics are surveyed, including mechanics, magnetism, celestial mechanics, fluid drag experiments, mineralogy, and human anatomy. Extensive bibliographical references are provided.

These textbooks (1750s) at least somewhat ambiguously reflect incorrect Cartesian vortex mechanics, rather than the correct Newtonian mechanics fully embraced by Johann Baptiste Horvath (1770s). Indeed, modern Newtonian mechanics (1687) was only widely accepted in Hungary by the 1760s and 1770s. Between 1616 and 1759, three years after first publication of Physica Generalis and Physica Particularis, Jesuit scientists could not publish textbooks overtly favoring Copernican models of the Solar System, although the heliocentric theory was allowed to be presented along with other theories (for example Ptolemaic as shown below in Plate 1 of Physica Particularis). However, since Nagyszombat had an astronomical observatory (1755–1773), historians speculate that local Jesuit professors would have observed phenomena that would have convinced them that heliocentrism was correct. Indeed, Jaszlinszky essentially rejected the Ptolemaic approach.

Jaszlinszky was also the author of Tractatus Theologicus de Angelis, Beatitudine et Actibus Humanis (Trnava, 1762/1769, 574 pp) and possibly Geographica (1761), in addition to Institutiones logicae (Trnava, 1754, 164 pp) and Institutiones metaphysicae (Trnava, 1755, 288 pp), consistent with how the Ratio Studiorum (1599) was applied following Christopher Clavius.

A copy of Physica Generalis is provided by Google Books. Images of the textbook title pages are also available.

== Gallery ==
=== Plates (8) from Physica Generalis (1756) ===
The plates shown below are from a copy owned by multiple professors at the Collegio Romano around 1762.

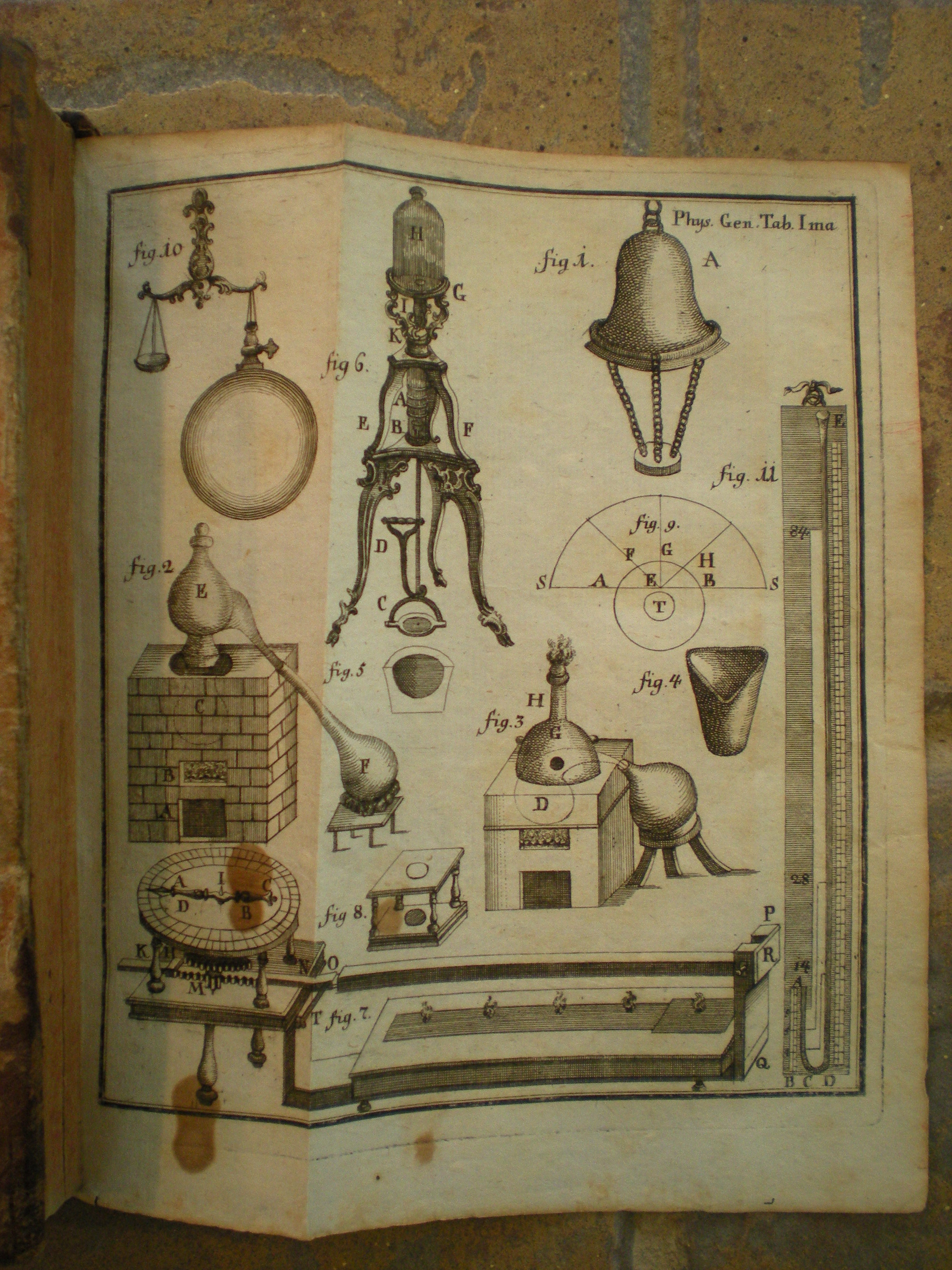
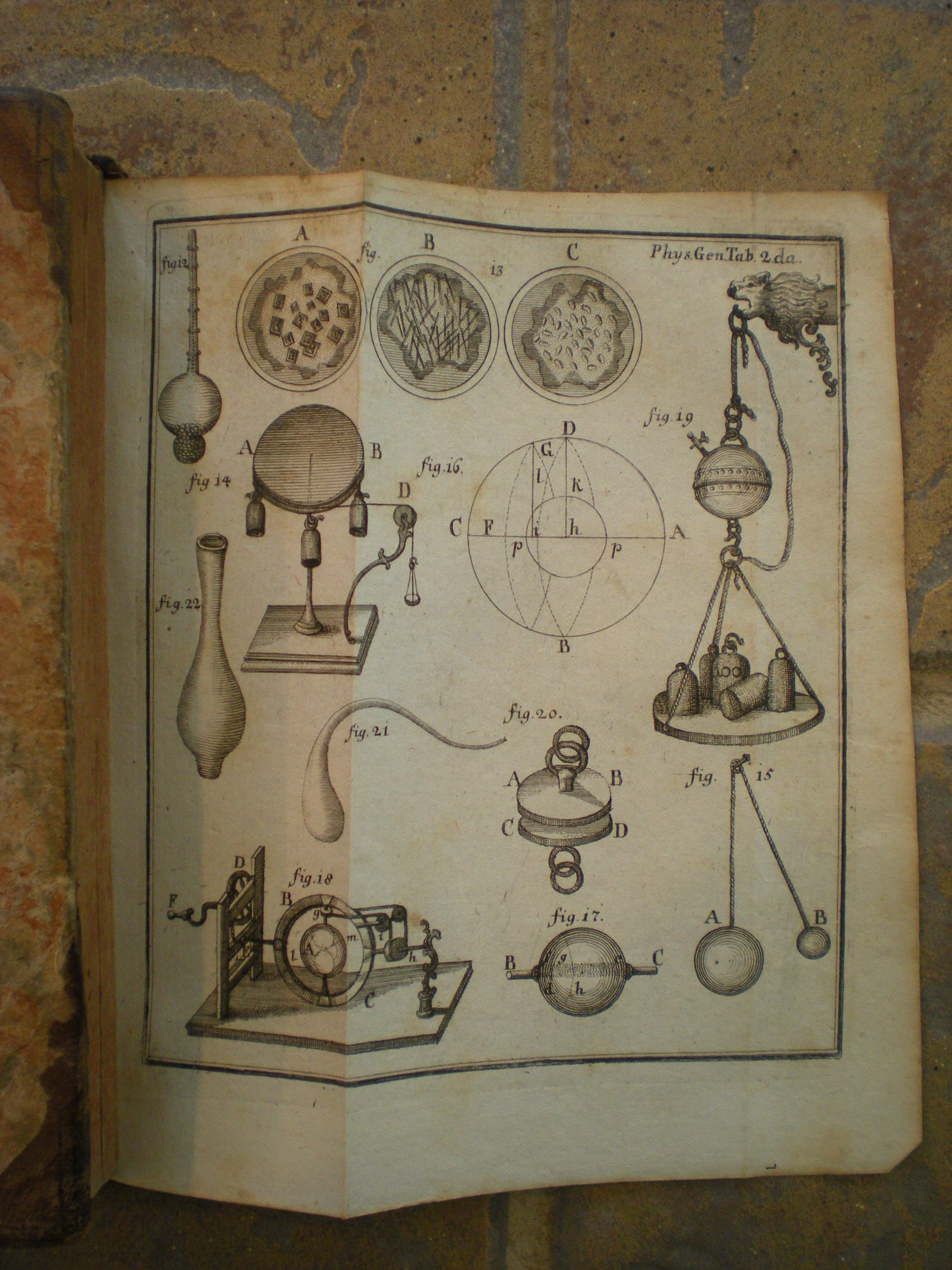
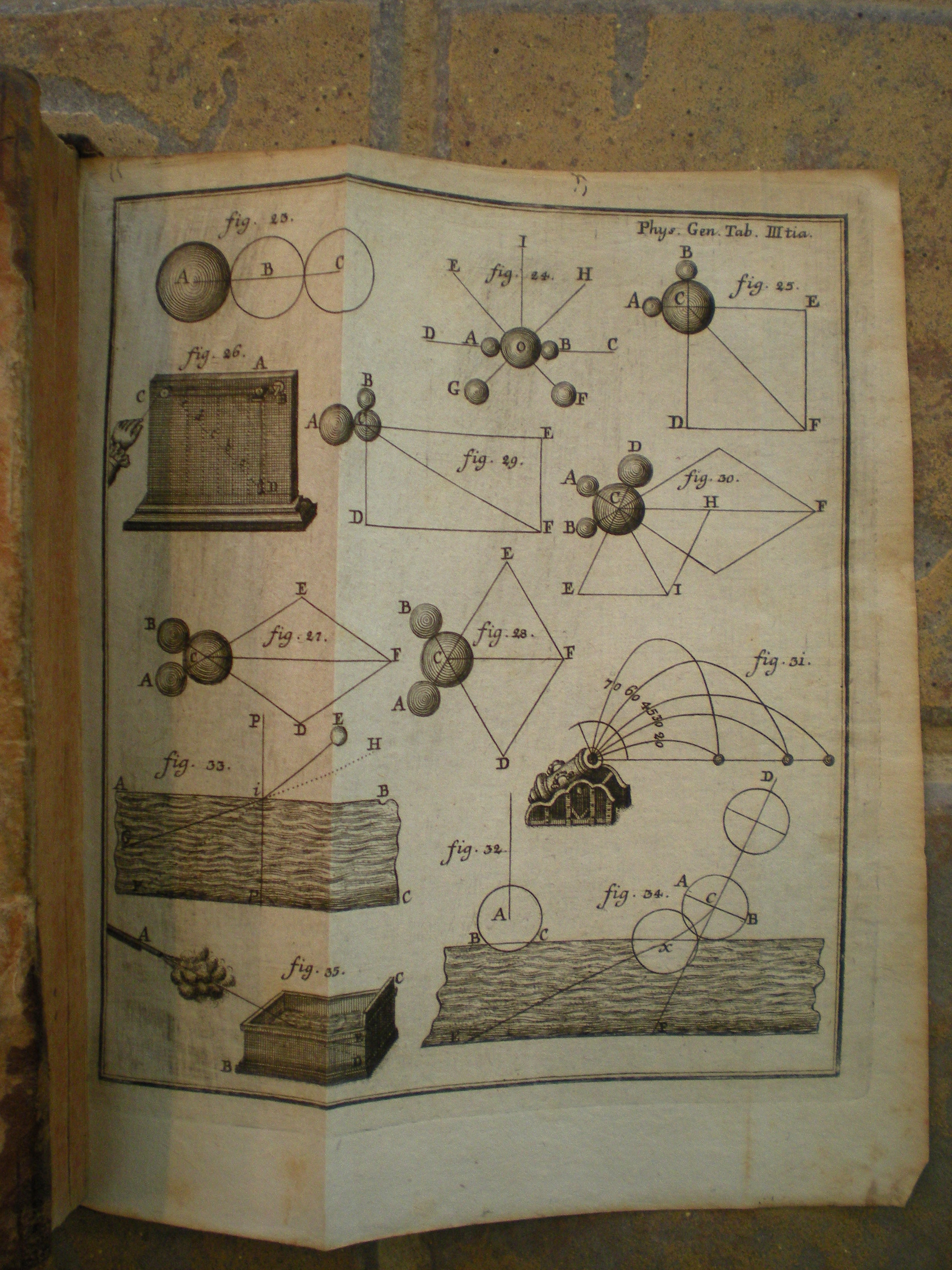
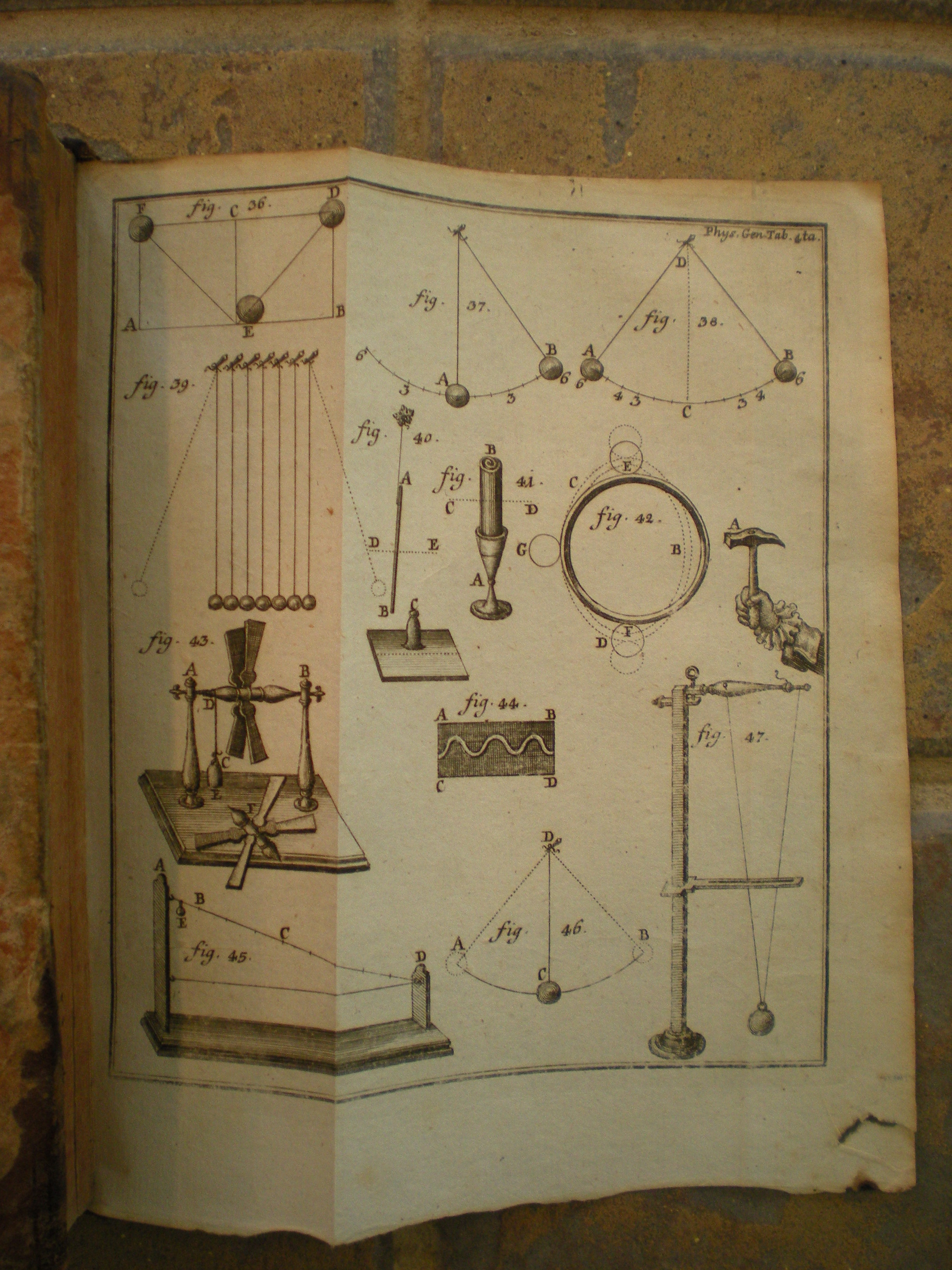
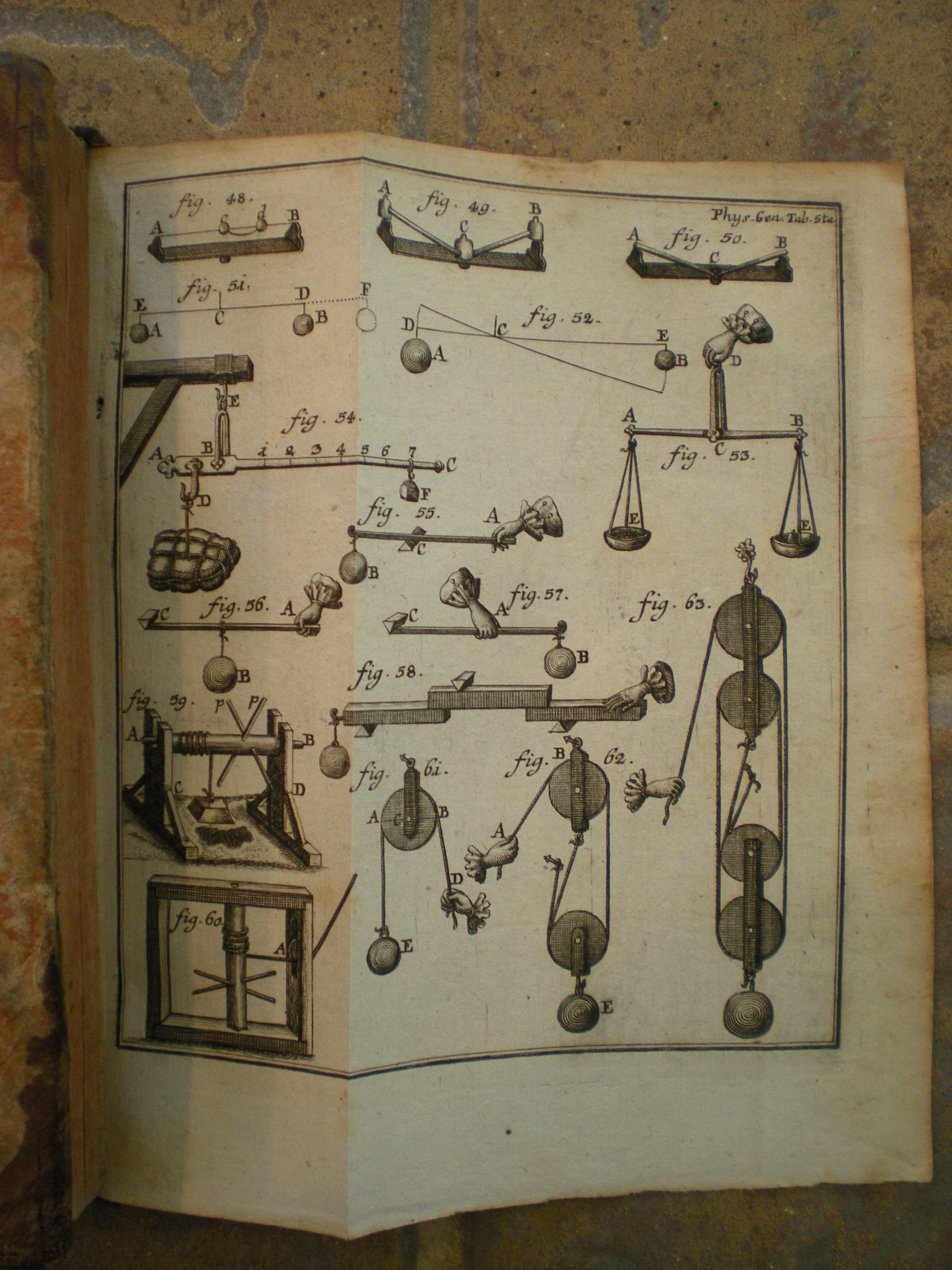
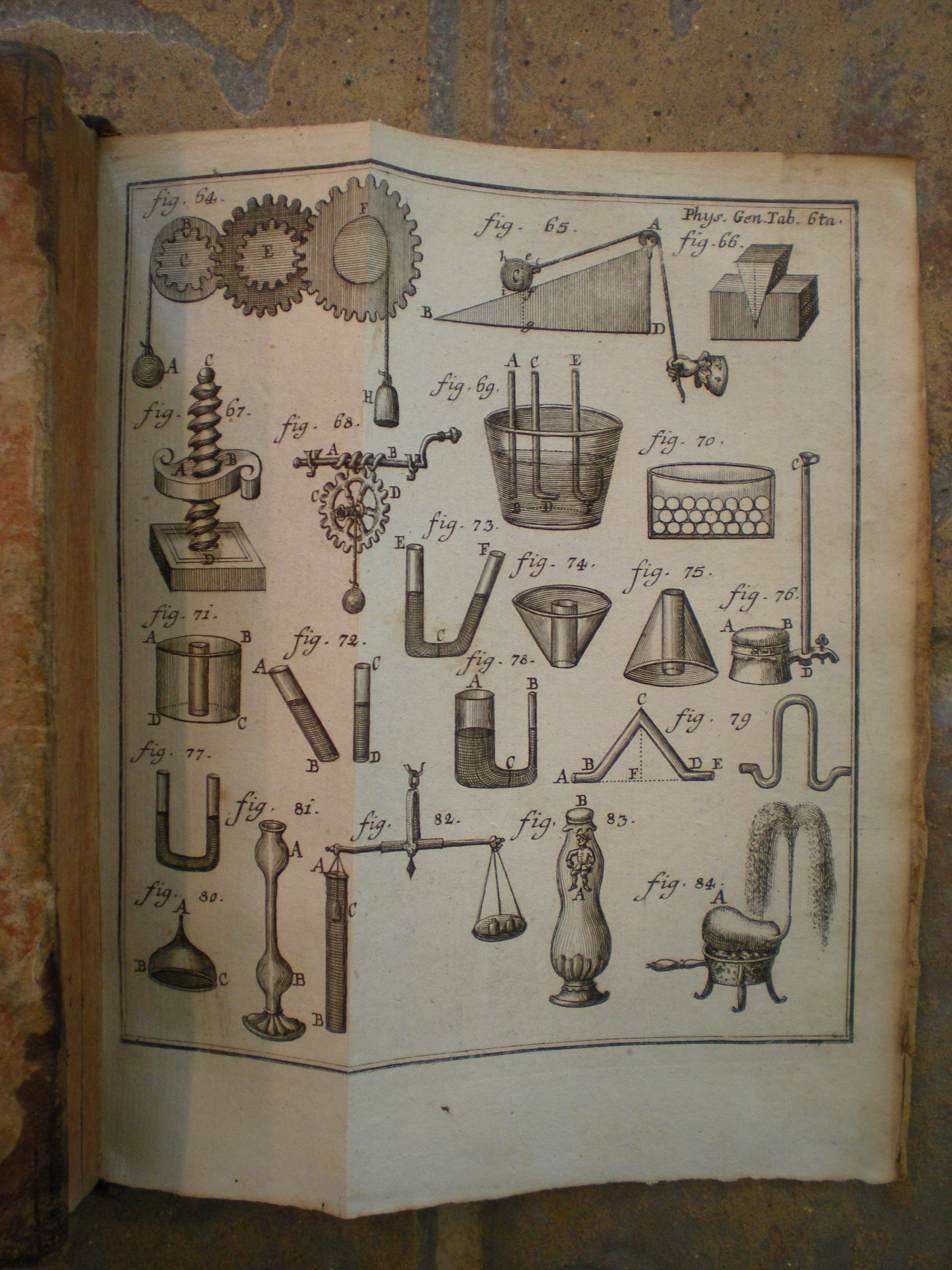
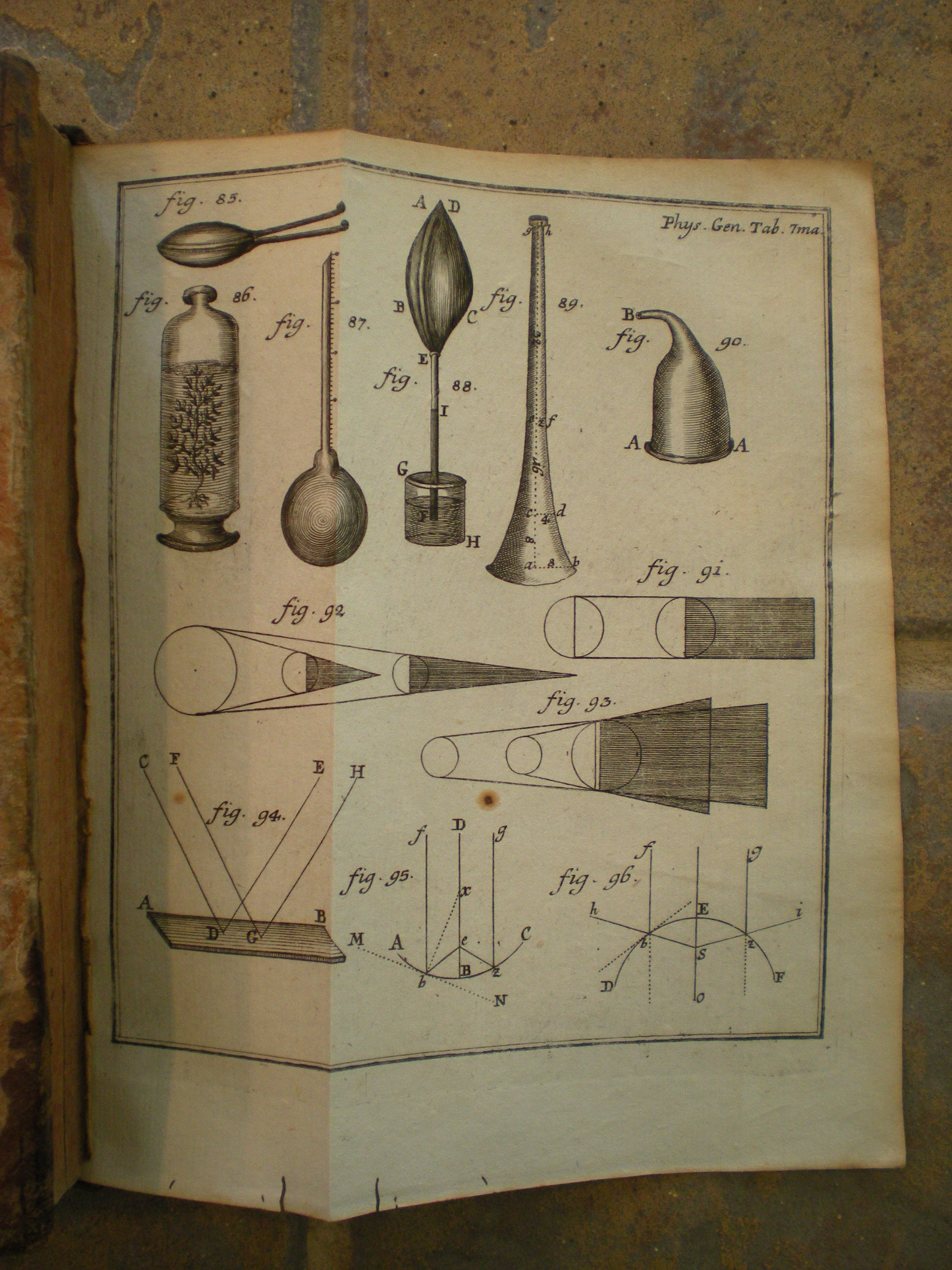
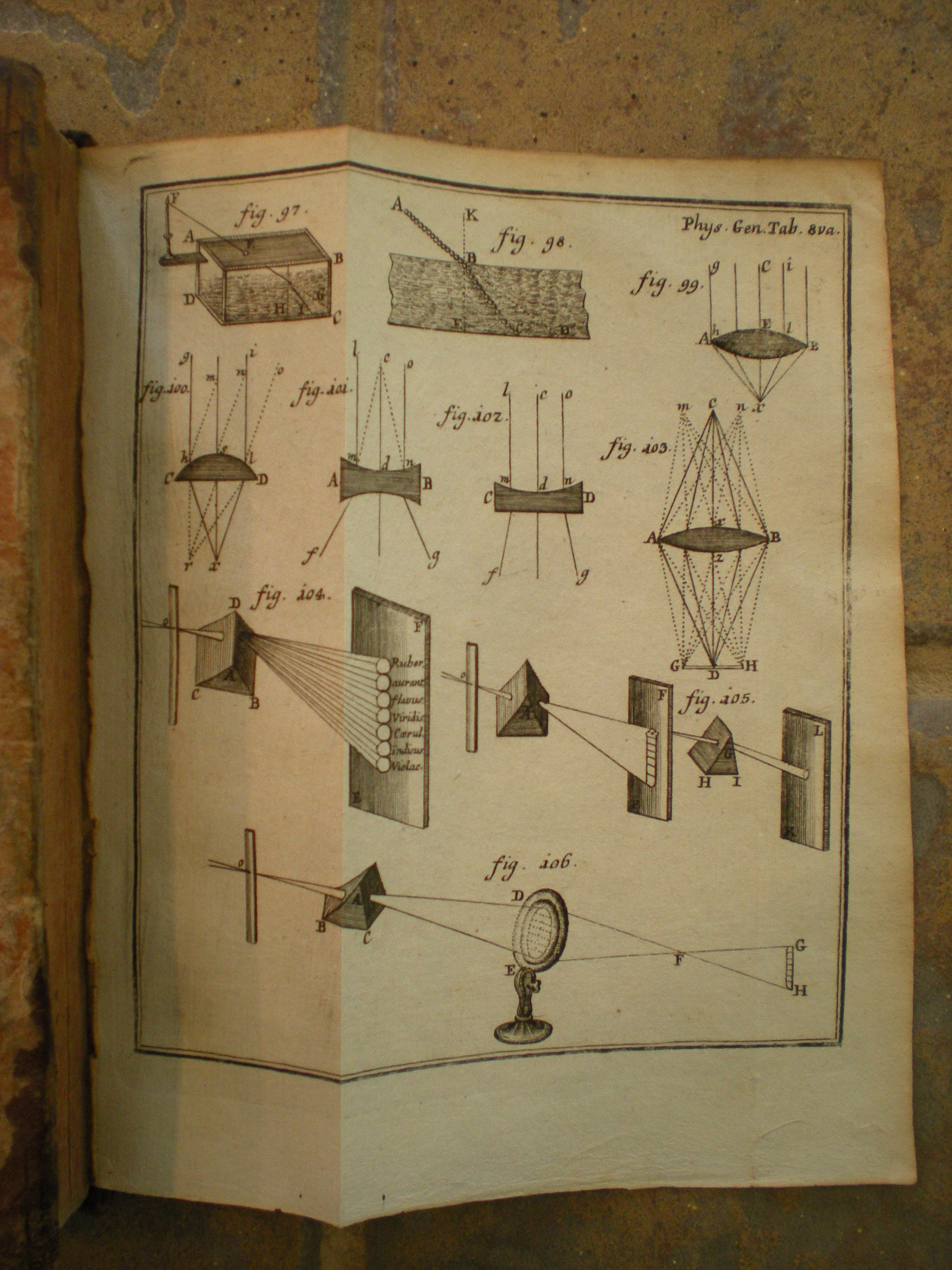

=== Plates (8) from Physica Particularis (1756) ===
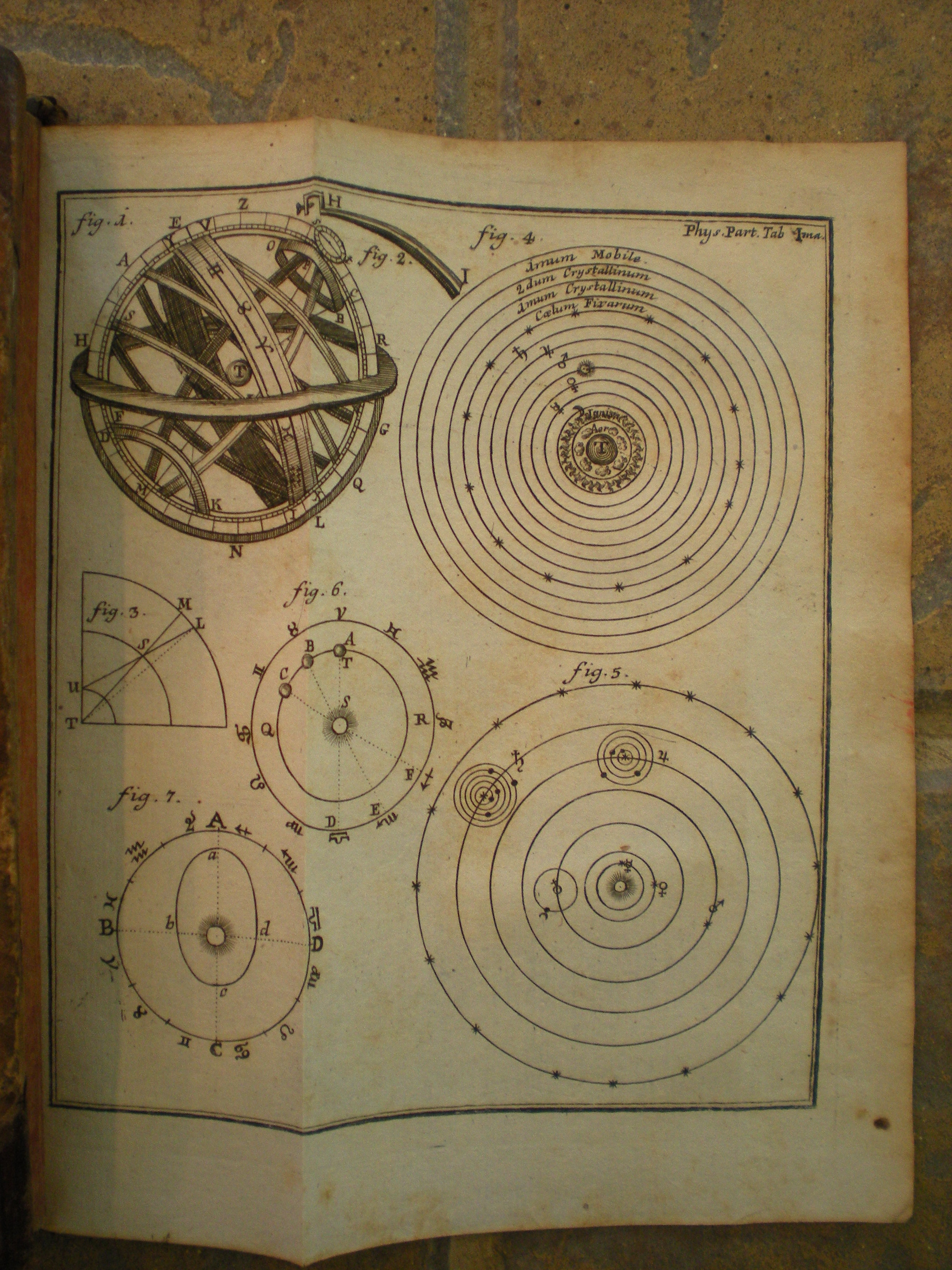
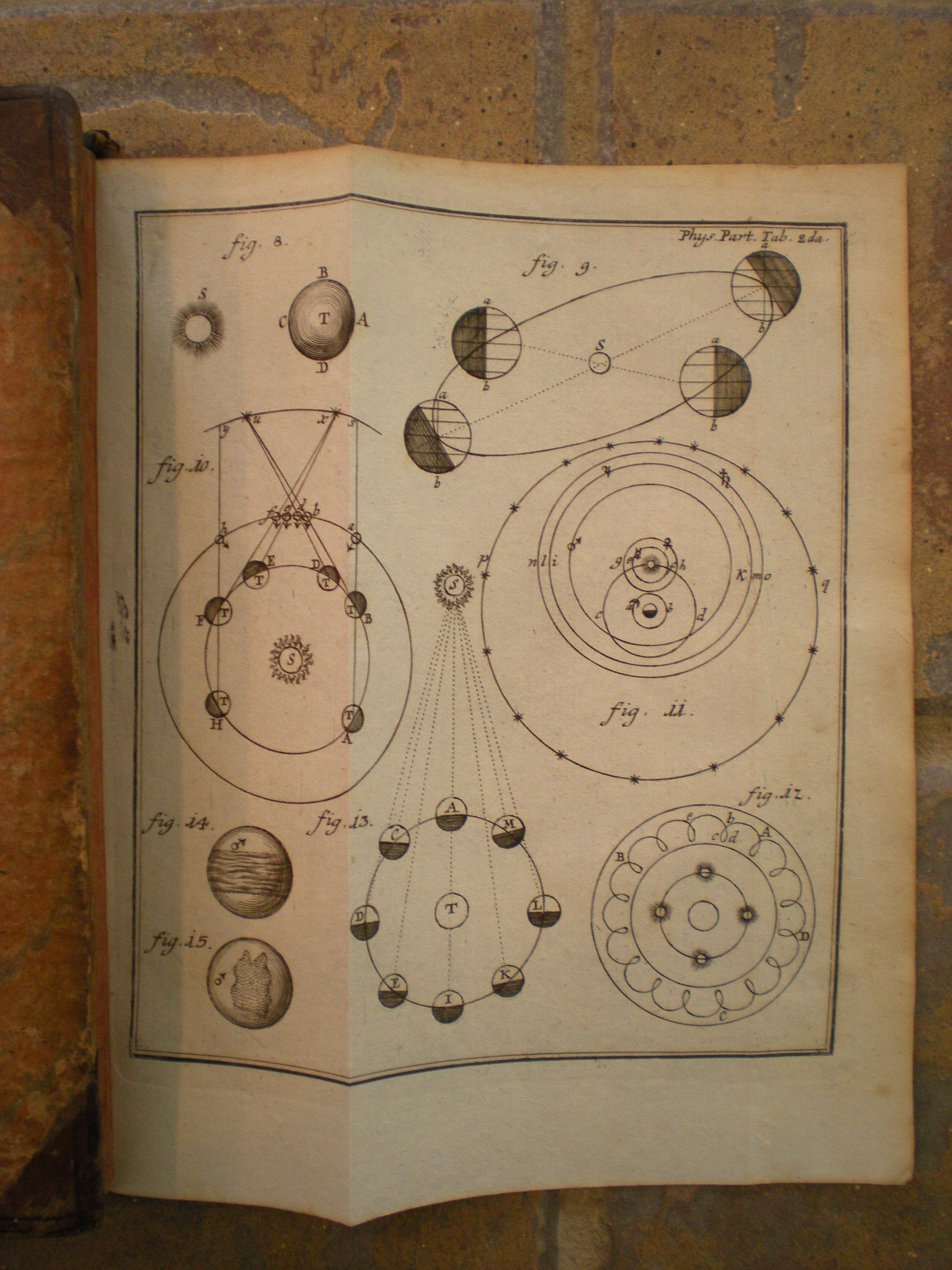
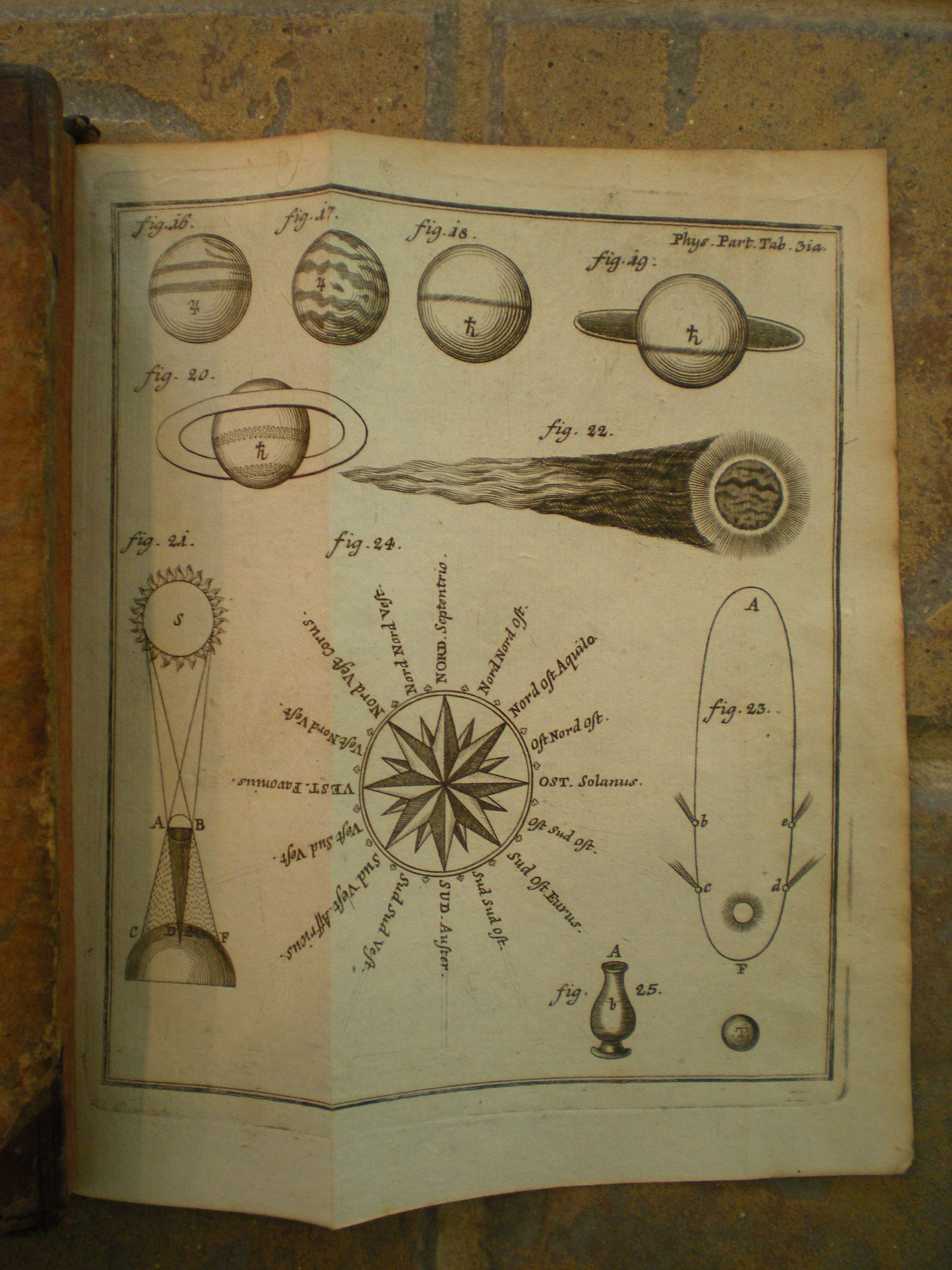
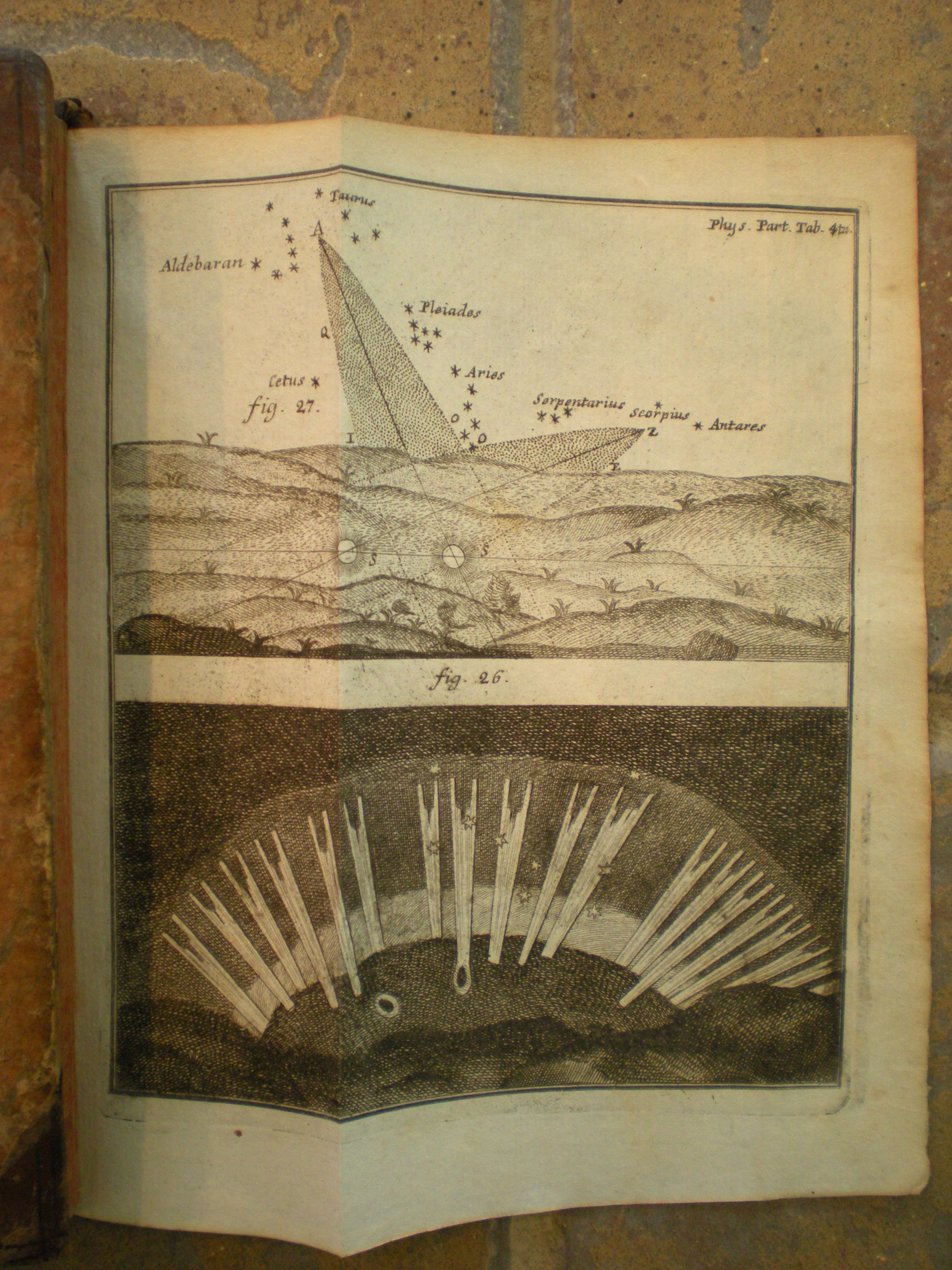
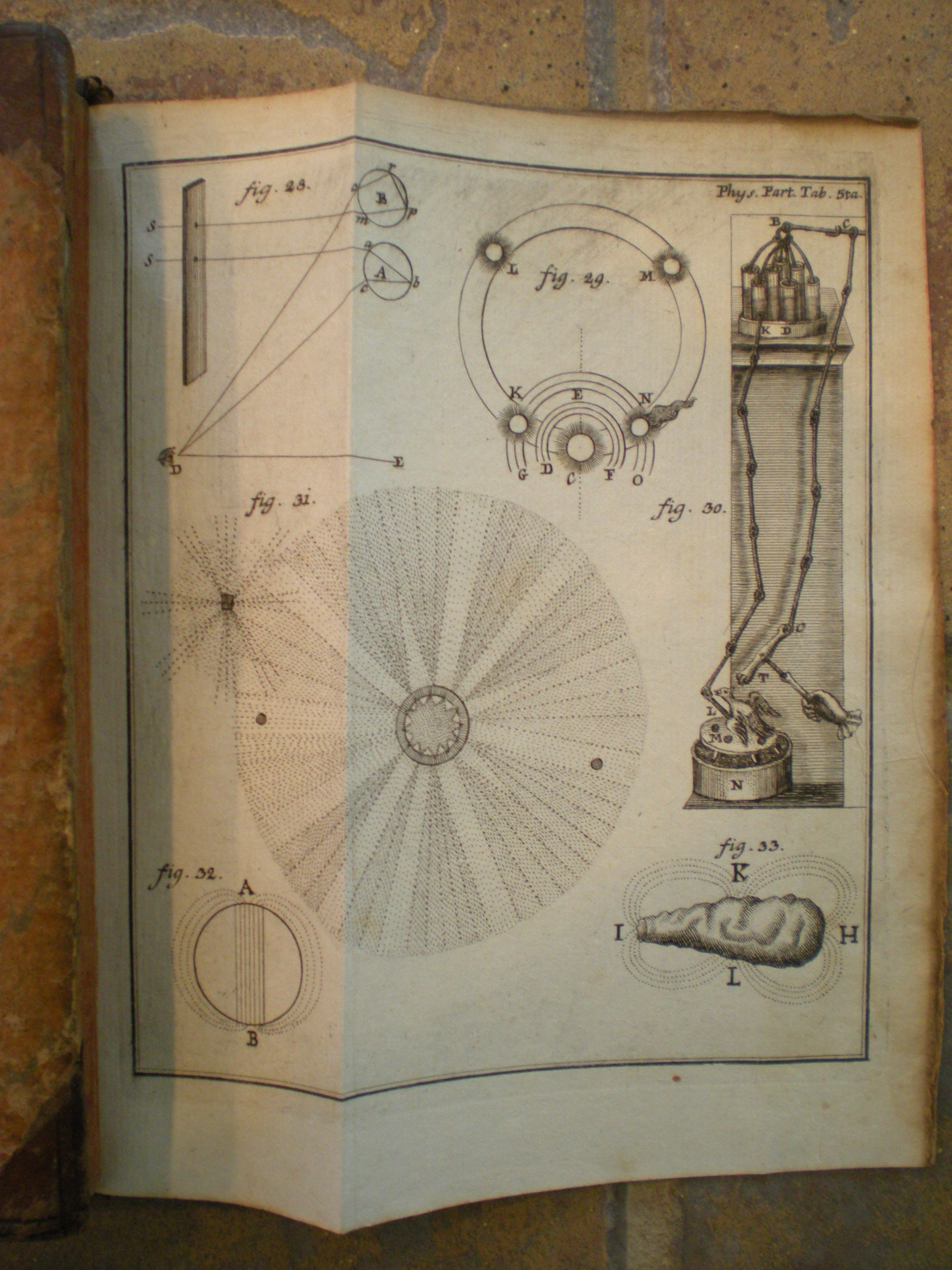
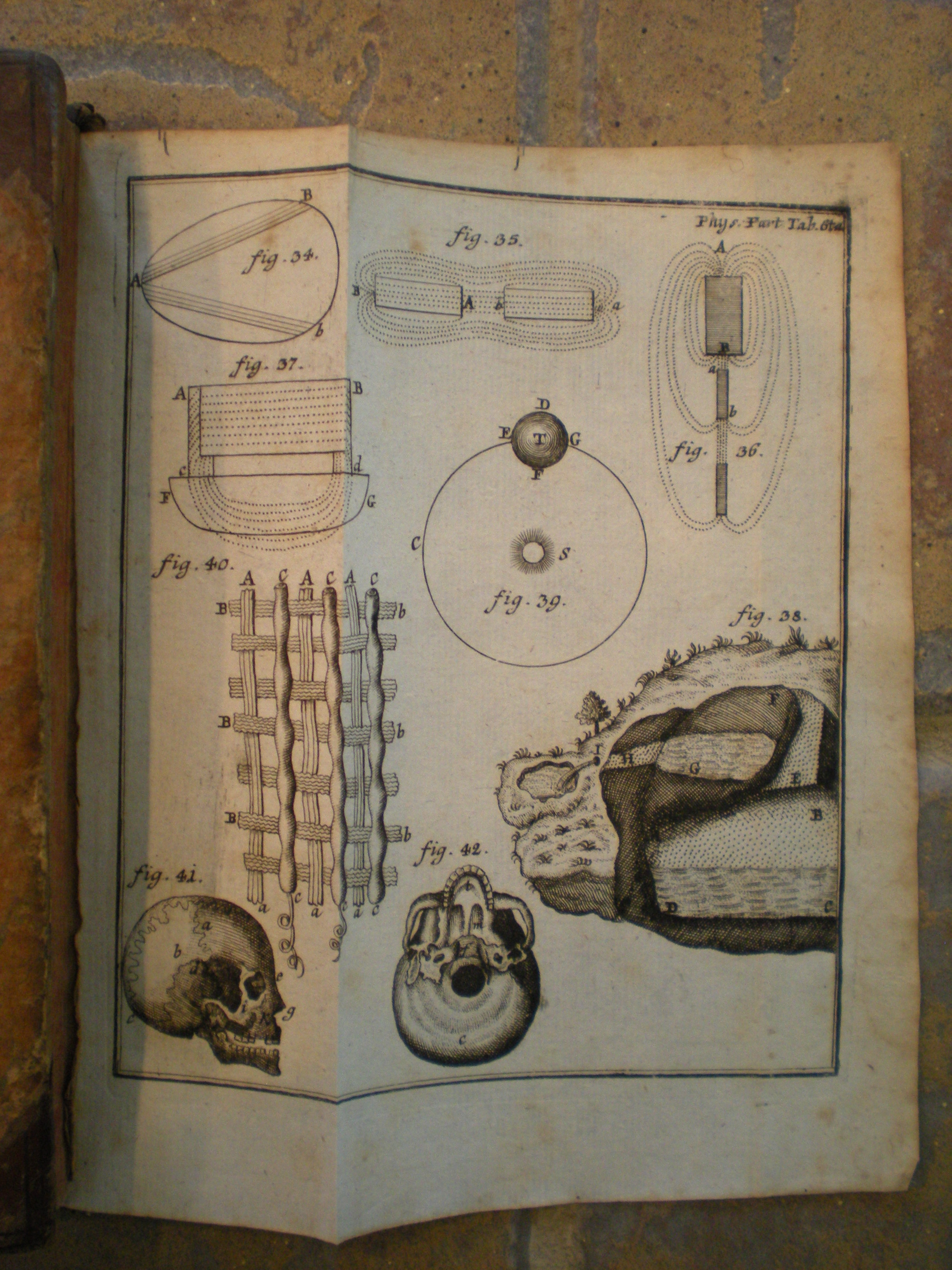
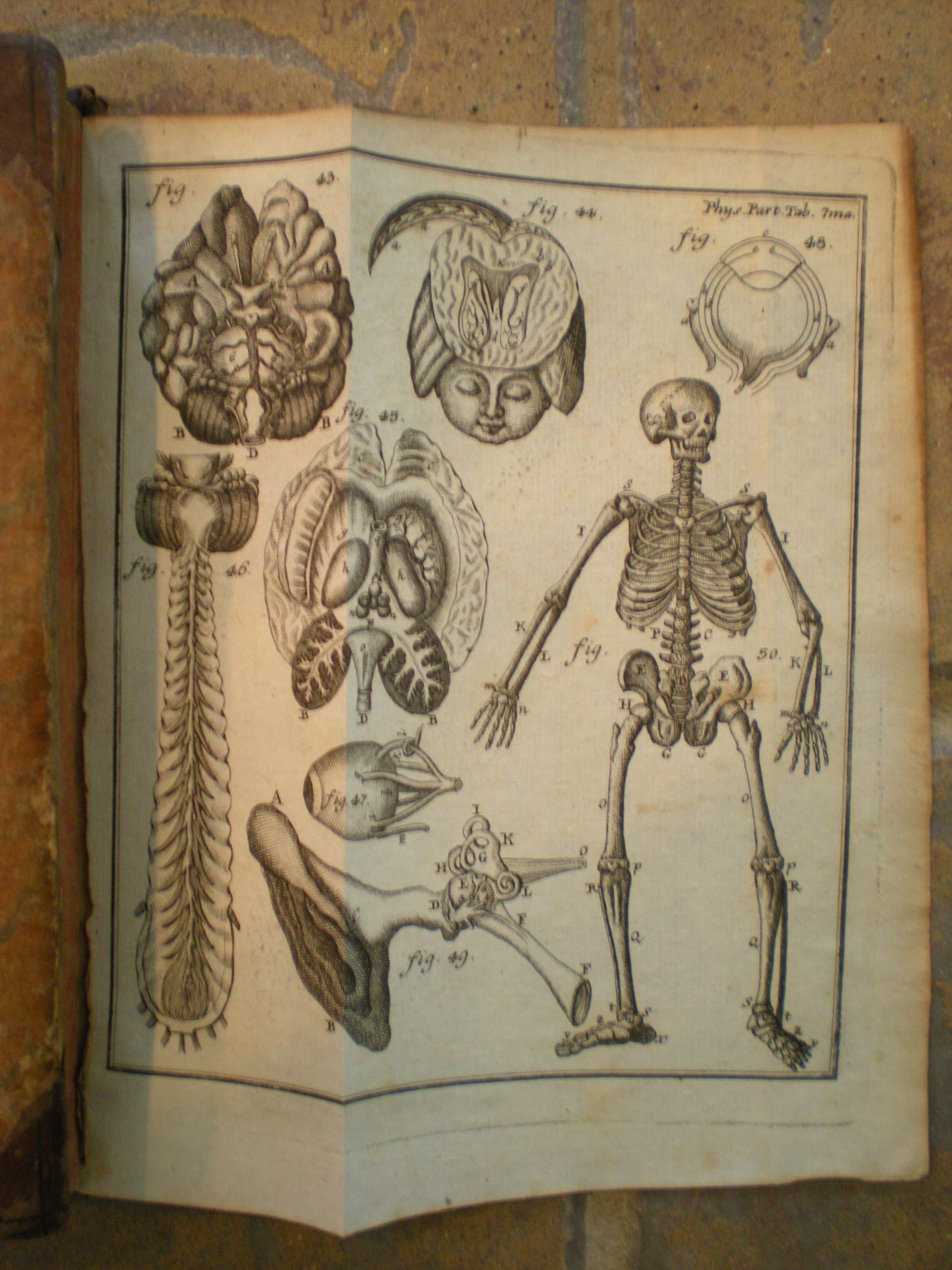
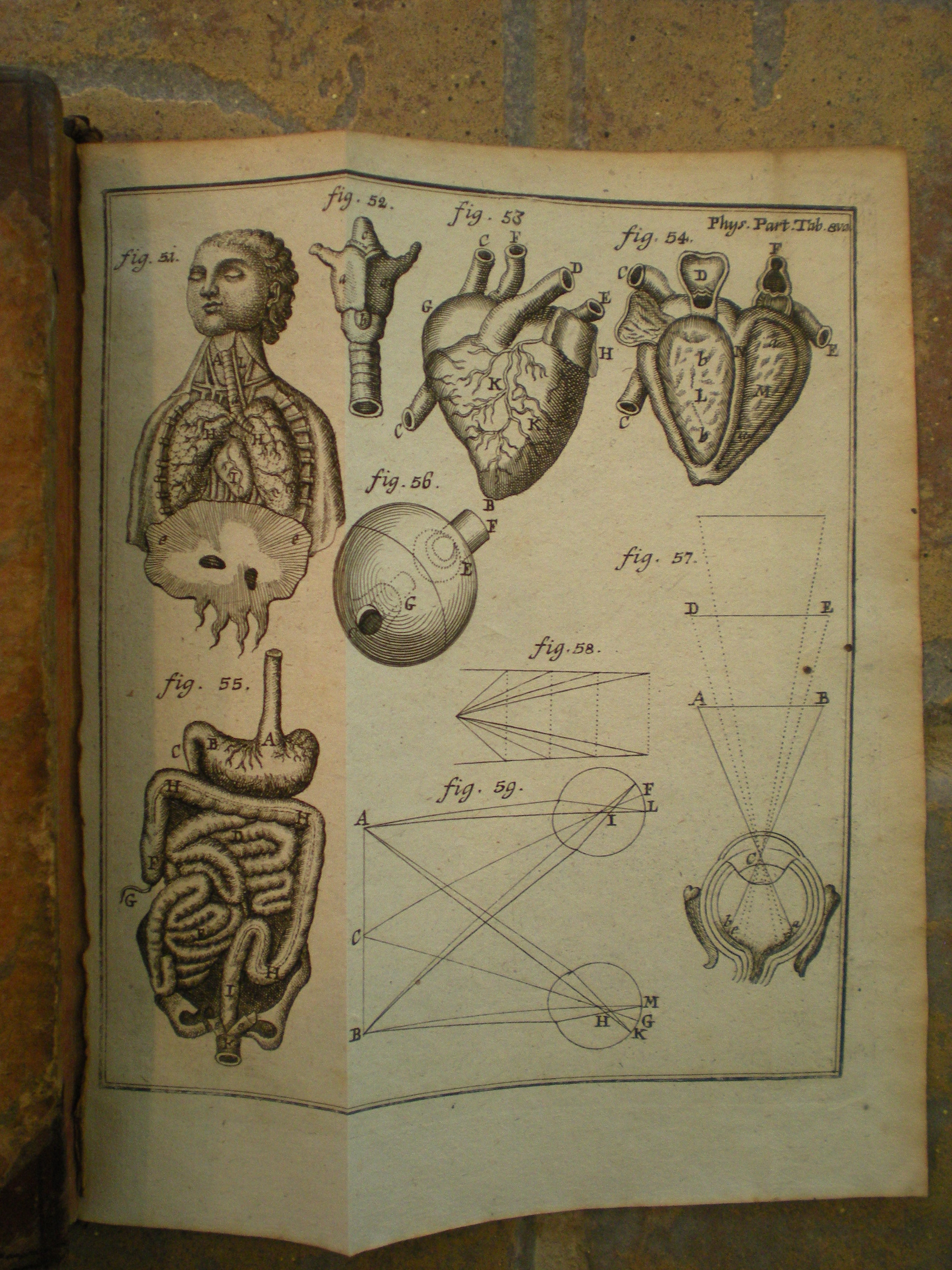

== See also ==
- Edmond Pourchot
- Pierre Lemonnier
- Philip of the Blessed Trinity
- Charles Morton
