= Dennis Moore =

Dennis or Denis Moore may refer to:

- Dennis Moore (actor) (1908–1964), American actor who appeared in many Western films between 1936 and 1957
- Dennis Moore (politician) (1945–2021), member of the United States House of Representatives from Kansas
- Denis Moore (cricketer) (1910–2003), English cricketer
- Denis Moore (American football) (1944–1995), American football player
- "Dennis Moore", an episode of the British television programme Monty Python's Flying Circus, as well as a character in that episode

== See also ==
- Denny Moore (born 1944), American linguist and anthropologist
