= Alan Melville =

South African cricketer (1910–1983)

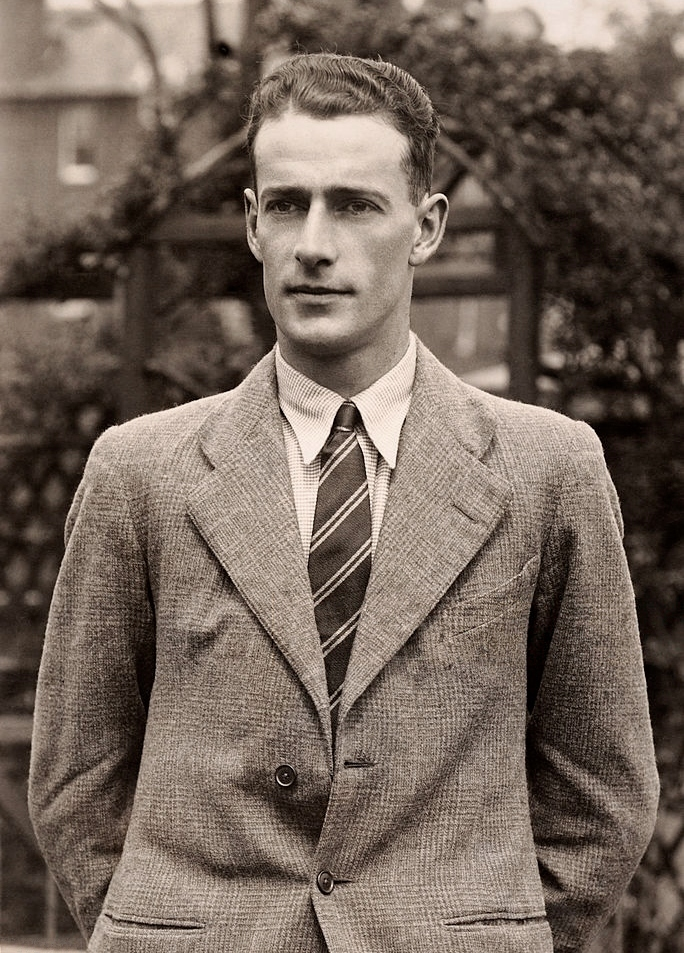
- Melville in about 1935

Personal information
- Full name: Alan Melville
- Born: 19 May 1910; Carnarvon, Cape Province, South Africa
- Died: 18 April 1983 (aged 72); Sabie, Transvaal, South Africa
- Batting: Right-handed
- Bowling: Right-arm leg-break; Right-arm off-break
- Role: All-rounder
- Relatives: Colin Melville (brother); Christopher Melville (nephew)

International information
- National side: South Africa
- Test debut (cap 152): 24 December 1938 v England
- Last Test: 5 January 1949 v England

Domestic team information
- Years: Team
- 1928/29–1929/30: Natal
- 1930–1933: Oxford University
- 1932–1936: Sussex
- 1936/37–1948/49: Transvaal

Career statistics
Competition	Test	First-class
Matches	11	190
Runs scored	894	10,598
Batting average	52.58	37.85
100s/50s	4/3	25/53
Top score	189	189
Balls bowled	–	6,927
Wickets	–	132
Bowling average	–	29.99
5 wickets in innings	–	7
10 wickets in match	–	0
Best bowling	–	5/17
Catches/stumpings	8/–	155/–
- Source: CricketArchive, 25 May 2013

Alan Melville (19 May 1910 – 18 April 1983) was a South African cricketer who played in 11 Test matches from 1938 to 1949. He was born in Carnarvon, Northern Cape, South Africa and died at Sabie, Transvaal.

== Early life and cricket career ==
Melville was a right-handed middle-order batsman sometimes used as an opener and a right-arm leg-break and googly bowler who later switched to off-breaks. Educated at Michaelhouse, he was still a schoolboy when he appeared first for Natal in 1928–29. In his first first-class game, he took five Transvaal wickets for 71 runs in the second innings. His second match was a trial for the 1929 South African tour to England and he scored 123, putting on 283 for the second Natal wicket with Jack Siedle; he also took four more wickets in the game. After this performance, his father was approached to discuss a place in the touring team for him, but it was decided that he would continue with his studies with the aim of going to Oxford University later in 1929.

Before he went to Oxford, Melville was involved in a car accident in which he fractured three vertebrae; he appeared to have made a full recovery and was able to take his place at Oxford in the autumn of 1929.

== Cricket in England ==
Melville made an unbeaten century in the Freshman's trial match at Oxford and was thereafter a regular in the Oxford University side over the next four years, winning a Blue each year.

He scored 78 in his first first-class innings for Oxford against Kent in May 1930. In the next game, he scored 118 against Yorkshire. He did not maintain that form, but finished with 591 runs at an average of 32.83, plus 19 rather expensive wickets, though he was not successful with either bat or ball in the University Match against Cambridge University. Melville's record improved slightly in 1931, with 631 runs and an average of 35.05, though there were no centuries. Injury to the university team's designated captain, Denis Moore, meant that Melville led the side in the University Match where, with an unbeaten 238 from the Nawab of Pataudi which overshadowed 201 for Cambridge by Alan Ratcliffe, Oxford achieved the first victory over Cambridge since 1923. In 1932, Melville was the Oxford captain in his own right, but his season was disrupted by injury – though not to the same degree as Moore's had been in 1931 – when he broke his collarbone while batting in the match against the Free Foresters by colliding with his partner, Pieter van der Bijl. Melville had made an unbeaten century, 113* before the collision. On his return to the side in late June, he was successful with the ball, taking a hat-trick and nine wickets in the game against H. D. G. Leveson Gower's XI, and he finished top of the university bowling averages. In the University Match, Melville was unable to repeat his leadership success of 1931, and the match was drawn.

Following the end of the 1932 University cricket season, Melville made his debut for Sussex, playing in 11 matches and scoring consistent runs, if with no high scores. Unusually, though no longer captain, he returned to Oxford in 1933 for a fourth season and a fourth Blue and although he featured in fewer than half the university side's matches, he hit his highest Oxford score, an innings of 127 made in less than two-and-a-quarter hours against a very weak Surrey attack at The Oval. He played for Sussex again in the second half of the 1933 season and, as in the previous year, was not conspicuously successful – until, virtually at the end of the season, the West Indian touring team played Sussex. Facing a big West Indian total, Sussex, with Melville as stand-in captain, opened with Ted Bowley and John Langridge, and Manny Martindale and Herman Griffith were both bowling with aggressively and using leg theory, the tactic that had been used in the Bodyline controversy of the previous winter by England in Australia. Bowley was quickly hurt and retired; Melville came in and began hitting the bowling; Langridge was then also forced to retire hurt (he later returned to make 172), but Melville went on to 114 and a four-man first-wicket stand of 223.

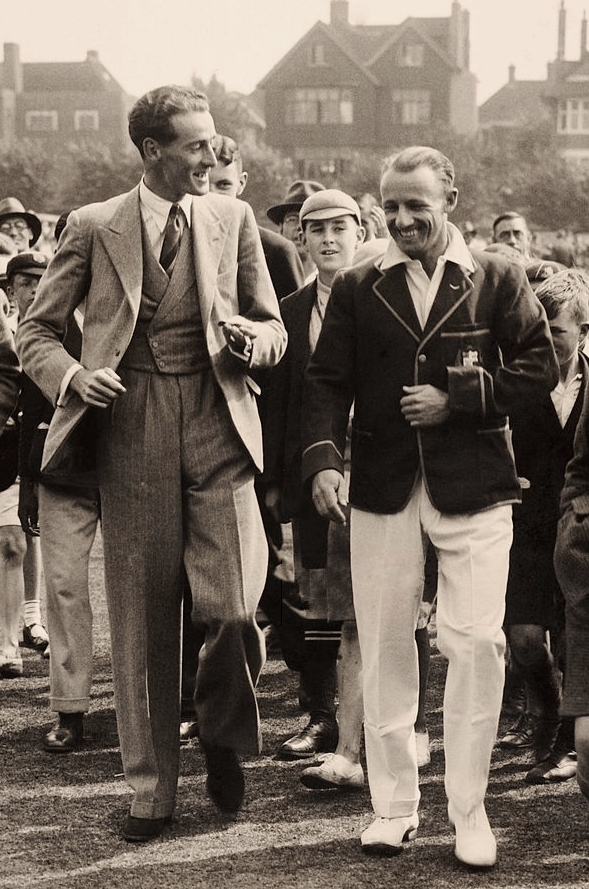
Melville with the Australian captain Don Bradman before their match on 25 August 1934

The reason Melville was captaining Sussex at the end of the 1933 season was that the regular captain Robert Scott, himself a stand-in for the permanently unwell K. S. Duleepsinhji, had stood down because of the death of his father; Scott was unable to resume in 1934, and Melville took over the Sussex captaincy for the next two seasons. Sussex had finished second in the County Championship for each of the preceding two seasons and under Melville in 1934 they again finished second, but there was veiled criticism of changes to the county's style of play in the 1935 edition of Wisden Cricketers' Almanack. "Sussex, renowned for their attractive and enterprising hitting, developed a somewhat stodgy game in their efforts to finish at the top and they thus defeated their own ends," it said. "At times they would not risk anything." Wisden compared Melville's "strange disinclination to experiment" with the adventurous approach taken by Maurice Tate, the senior professional at the club, who captained the side when Melville missed a few games. As a batsman, Melville was highly successful, scoring 1504 runs at an average of 42.97 with three centuries, though in the heady world of Sussex batting at the time that still left him only fifth in the county's batting averages, behind Tommy Cook, John Langridge, Jim Parks, Sr. and Harry Parks.

In the winter of 1934–35, Melville was operated on for appendicitis. He recovered in time to lead the team through the season, and though he again missed a few matches, he had a personally successful season, heading Sussex's Championship batting averages and scoring in all matches a total of 1904 runs at an average of 40.51. His side had a mixed season, falling to seventh in the County Championship. At the end of the 1935 season, Melville resigned the Sussex captaincy; he played only irregularly for Sussex in the 1936 season though he finished with a flourish, scoring 152, his highest first-class score to that point, in his last game for the county, the match against the Indians. When the season was over, he left England, moving back to South Africa where he took a job on the Johannesburg Stock Exchange.

== Cricket in South Africa ==
Back in South Africa, Melville became captain of the Johannesburg-based Wanderers Cricket Club and in December 1936 played his first game for Transvaal, though he did not appear in Transvaal's Currie Cup matches that season. The following year, however, he captained Transvaal in six of its seven Currie Cup matches as the team shared the title with Natal; he had little success with the bat himself, scoring just 109 runs at an average of 15.57 and did not bowl at all. In fact, after his return to South Africa from England in 1936 he scarcely bowled at all.

Despite this indifferent form, Melville was selected as the captain for the five Tests on the England tour of 1938–39: the series was his own Test debut. The five matches suffered at times, Wisden wrote, from "slow-motion methods adopted by both sides" and culminated in a timeless Test that nevertheless had to be left as a draw after 10 days. England won the series by winning the third game, with all the others left drawn.

Melville himself took a while to adapt to Test cricket. He was out without scoring in the only innings of the first game, one of five ducks in an innings of 390. For the second match, he demoted himself from No 3 in the batting order to No 9 and scored 23 in his only innings. For the third match, he went in at No 8 and scored 5 not out and 10. Respite for Melville from this series of mediocre personal performances with a match for a Combined Transvaal XI against the MCC touring team immediately after the third Test defeat. Though he scored only 1 in the first innings, he resorted to opening the batting in the second innings and scored 107 "cutting, driving and hooking with effortless ease", Wisden reported. That led him to open the South African innings in the fourth Test and he and van der Bijl – his collision partner from Oxford in 1932 – put on an opening partnership of 108 before Melville was out for 67. Rain had spoiled the possibility of a South African victory in the fourth game, but the fifth match was due to be played to a finish, South Africa attempted to win through sheer weight of runs: the first innings lasted two-and-a-half days and totalled 530. Van der Bijl and Melville improved on their first-wicket stand in the first innings, scoring 131 before Melville was out for 78. After bowling England out for 316, Melville did not enforce the follow-on and the South Africans in their second innings scored 481; Melville himself had an injured thigh and this time came in at No 6 but scored 103, his first Test century. Despite the heavy scoring the match was left drawn after the 10th day when the England team, having scored 654 for five wickets in pursuit of a victory target of 696, were forced to leave the match as a draw to catch their ship home.

Melville served with the South African forces during the Second World War, but an injury in training brought about a recurrence of the back injury he had suffered as a teenager in 1929 and for almost a year he wore a steel jacket; Wisden wrote that "it was thought that he would never play cricket again".

== Postwar cricket and captaincy in England ==
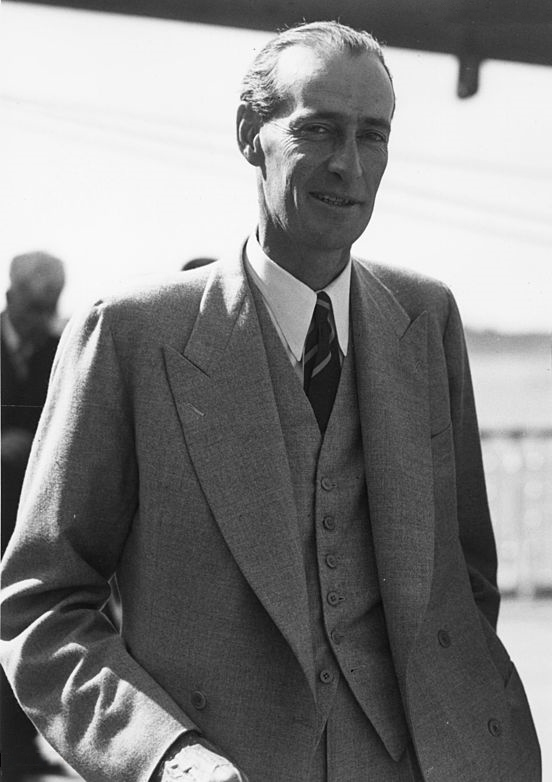
Melville in 1947

Discharged from the forces in 1945, Melville undertook an intensive programme of rehabilitation and was able to resume his cricket career early in 1946. Almost immediately, he was forced to stand down again and it was feared that his back injury had returned; in fact, he was not injured, but his wife had contracted poliomyelitis and while she recovered he looked after their children. He returned to cricket at the start of the 1946–47 season and in the first match scored a new personal highest score with an innings of 153, putting on 299 for the seventh wicket with Bruce Mitchell which was a partnership record for that wicket in South African cricket. With his wife recovered and his own fitness not in doubt, he was picked as captain for the 1947 South African tour of England.

The 1947 English cricket season was dominated by the run-getting exploits of Denis Compton and Bill Edrich, and the South African side led by Melville suffered at the hands of both batsmen in a hot summer made for batting. In the first half of the season, however, Melville's own batting form was almost as good, despite breaking a bone in his little finger early on and also straining his thigh during the first Test. He made centuries in the second match of the tour against Leicestershire and in the fourth match against Surrey. His form took a bit of a dip when he moved up to open the innings because Dennis Dyer, the expected opening partner for Bruce Mitchell, was badly out of form (and subsequently proved to have been ill for most of the season). The change proved successful in the first Test match, however: Melville scored a career-best 189 in the first innings and then, when the South Africans went in wanting 227 to win the match in 140 minutes, he hit an unbeaten 104 in the second innings, though the match remained drawn. Melville's performance set several records: this was the first time a South African batsman had scored two separate hundreds in a Test match; his first innings of 189 was at the time the highest by a South African against England, though Mitchell equalled it and was not out later in the same series; Melville's third-wicket partnership of 319 with vice-captain Dudley Nourse was a record in all Test cricket for that wicket, though beaten by Compton and Edrich for England later in the series, and South Africa's highest for any wicket; the South African total of 533 was the highest against England; and Melville's two centuries meant he had scored three Test centuries in succession, as his final innings in 1938–39 had been 103.

Melville was not finished with record-setting, however. In the next Test at Lord's, with the South Africans facing a huge England total, he scored yet another century, 117, to equal the record of four consecutive Test centuries set by Jack Fingleton in the 1930s. The record of four hundreds in consecutive Test innings was beaten a year later by Everton Weekes of the West Indies who achieved five centuries in a row; Melville's (and Fingleton's) record of four has since been equalled only by Rahul Dravid. The rest of the Lord's Test was less successful, however, and the South Africans lost the match after being forced to follow on, with Melville making just 8 in the second innings.

The match at Lord's set the pattern for the rest of the tour as South Africa's limited bowling and inconsistent batting were exposed by England's weight of runs from Compton and Edrich and the home side's greater bowling variety and experience. Melville made 17 and 59 in the third Test, played at Manchester, which was also lost. The Leeds Test brought him scores of 0 and 30 in two weak South African batting performances, and a third Test defeat in succession. The fifth Test, played in what Wisden called "extreme heat", ended in a tense draw with the South Africans, seeking 451 for what would have been a record-breaking win, finishing at 423 for seven wickets: Melville dropped down the batting order in this game and scored 39 and 6. In the five Tests, Melville had scored 569 runs at an average of 63.22; this put him third in the batting averages behind Nourse and Mitchell, but the three of them all scored more than double the number of runs of any other South African batsman.

Outside the Tests, there was just one more century for Melville, against his old colleagues at Sussex, with an unbeaten 114 in a total of 555 for six wickets. On the tour as a whole, he scored 1547 runs at an average of 40.71. Though the tour was not successful in terms of the Tests, Melville won praise for his captaincy and for his own performances, and was named a Wisden Cricketer of the Year in the 1948 edition of the Almanack. However, the physical effect on him was significant, as Wisden noted: "The mental and physical exhaustion, indeed, took such toll of a never robust physique that on his return to South Africa Melville weighed 27 pounds less than when he set out." He announced his retirement from first-class cricket after a couple of matches for Transvaal in the winter that followed the tour.

== Final cricket and retirement ==
In the winter of 1948/49, an England cricket team under the captaincy of George Mann toured South Africa. Melville, nominally retired, was persuaded to play in an early-season first class match for Transvaal against Natal after which, in the last of a long line of injuries, he fractured a wrist; he recovered in time to play for Transvaal in the game against the touring side just before the first Test and scored 92 with what Wisden said was, "next to Hutton" – who scored 174 – "the best batting of the match". But Melville announced after the game that his wrist was not yet recovered enough for him to take part in the Test. He was finally fit in time for the third Test, a fortnight later, and this proved to be his last Test match, and also the only one in which he did not captain the South African side: used as an opening batsman, he scored 15 and 24 in a drawn match. He then played in a second game for Transvaal against the touring side, but failed to score in that, and ended his first-class cricket career.

In retirement, Melville remained an influential figure in South African cricket and was a selector for the South African cricket team for many years. He died suddenly on a trip to the Kruger National Park in 1983.

Sporting positions
Preceded by R. G. S. Scott	Sussex county cricket captain 1934–1935	Succeeded by A. J. Holmes
