= Charles Morton (educator) =

British nonconformist minister and educator

Charles Morton (15 February 1627 – 11 April 1698) was a British nonconformist minister and founder of an early dissenting academy, later in life associated in New England with Harvard College. Morton was raised with strong Puritan influences in England and attended Oxford (1649-1652). As a result of the English Revolution, he was arrested and excommunicated for promoting progressive education (he was the teacher of Daniel Defoe), forcing his immigration to relative safety in Massachusetts Bay Colony (1685-1686), although he was soon arrested for sedition (and then acquitted) in Boston.

His system of vernacular teaching at Harvard was basically Scholastic/Aristotelian with modern flavors of John Wallis, Robert Hooke, Robert Boyle, and even René Descartes. His works include discussions of astrology and alchemy, and (as a minister) he was known to have some interest in witchcraft. As a result, Compendium Physicae is now considered to be semi-scientific, and although the work contains then-modern references to Galileo, Torricelli, and gravity, his ancient/medieval Aristotelian approach was eventually replaced by Newtonian mechanics (Principia was also published in 1687).

== Life ==
He was born at Pendavy, Egloshayle, in Cornwall, and baptised there on 15 February 1627, the eldest son of Nicholas Morton, who married, on 11 May 1616, Frances, only daughter of Thomas Kestell of Pendavy. He was probably the Charles Morton, undergraduate of New Inn Hall, Oxford, who submitted on 4 May 1648 to the jurisdiction of the parliamentary visitors. On 7 September 1649 he was elected a scholar of Wadham College, and he graduated B.A. 6 November 1649, M.A. 24 June 1652, being also incorporated at Cambridge in 1653. At Oxford he was known as a mathematician and highly thought of by John Wilkins.

In 1655 Morton was appointed to the rectory of Blisland in Cornwall, but he was ejected after the 1662 Act of Uniformity, whereupon he retired to a small tenement, his own property, in St Ive. He lost property through the Great Fire of London, and went to London to support himself. Morton was probably the ‘Charles Morton, presbyterian,’ who in 1672 was licensed for a room in his dwelling-house in Kennington.

A few years later he ran at Newington Green, in those days a village north of London, the leading school for Dissenters, "probably on the site of the current Unitarian church". The Oxford Dictionary of National Biography judges Morton's "probably the most impressive of the dissenting academies [prior to 1685], enrolling as many as fifty pupils at a time". The ODNB goes on to describe its advanced and varied curriculum (religion, classics, history, geography, mathematics, natural science, politics, and modern languages) and a well-equipped laboratory, and even "a bowling green for recreation". Lectures were given in English, not Latin, and Daniel Defoe, one of Morton's students, praised its attention to the mother tongue. Many dissenting ministers, including John Shower, Samuel Lawrence, Thomas Reynolds, and William Hocker, were educated by Morton. Another of his pupils was Samuel Shute.

Such schools were both controversial and outside the letter of the law. Samuel Wesley the elder, a contemporary of Defoe's, described his teacher "as universal in his learning", but in 1703 attacked the dissenting academies, including Morton's, in his ‘Letter from a Country Divine'. A pamphlet war ensued, with the academies defended by the Rev. Samuel Palmer in ‘A Defence of the Dissenters' Education in their Private Academies,’ to which Wesley replied in ‘A Defence of a Letter on the Education of Dissenters,’ 1704, and Palmer retorted with ‘A Vindication of the Learning, Loyalty, Morals of the Dissenters. In answer to Mr. Wesley,’ 1705.

Legal actions from the bishop's court made Morton decide to emigrate. He arrived in New England in July 1686 with his wife, his pupil, Samuel Penhallow, and his nephew, Charles Morton, M.D. Another nephew had preceded them in 1685. It had been proposed that Morton should become the principal of Harvard College, but another person was appointed before his arrival. He was, however, made a member of the corporation of the college and its first vice-president, and he drew up a system of logic and a compendium of physics, which were for many years two of its text-books. Lectures on philosophy which he read in his own rooms were attended by several students from the college, and one or two discontented scholars desired to become inmates of his house, but these proceedings gave offence to the governing body. Morton was also inducted as minister of the first church in Charlestown, New England, on 5 November 1686, and was the first clergyman of the town who solemnised marriages. He was prosecuted for alleged seditious expressions in a sermon preached on 2 September 1687, but was acquitted. His name is the second of the petitioners to the council on 2 October 1693 for some encouragement to a system of propagating Christianity among the Native Americans, and his was the senior signature to an association for mutual assistance among the ministers of New England. He acted with those who urged the prosecutions for witchcraft at Salem, Massachusetts.

About 1694 Morton's health began to fail. He died at Charlestown on 11 April 1698, and was buried on 14 April, his funeral being attended by the officers of Harvard College and its students. By his will, dated November 1697, he left money to Harvard; his houses and lands at Charlestown and in Cornwall with the rest of his property passed to his two nephews, Charles and John Morton, and his niece in equal shares. An epitaph was written for him by the Rev. Simon Bradstreet, his successor in the ministry.

== Works ==
He was the author of the English language Compendium Physicae (1687), an early American textbook on astronomy and physics. The textbook was also known as [A] System of Physicks, and was among the most important texts in natural philosophy in early America, used to teach science and the scientific method to students at both Harvard and Yale from the late 1680s through the late 1720s. Morton's later treatise, which posited that birds migrated to the moon, was the earliest treatise on bird migration in England.

Compendium Physicae was probably completed prior to his immigration to America (around 1680), and all extant original copies (roughly 20) are traced to Harvard or Yale. Samuel Eliot Morison's transcription of 'Compendium Physicae' is published in "Publications of the Colonial Society of Massachusetts" vol. 33 (Boston: 1940).

A Logick System is transcribed by Rick Kennedy in "Aristotelian and Cartesian Logic at Harvard," "Publications of the Colonial Society of Massachusetts" vol. 67 (Boston: 1995).

John Dunton praised him in his Life and Errors. He published many small volumes on social and theological questions. A paper by him on ‘The Improvement of Cornwall by Seasand’ is in the Philosophical Transactions, x. 293–6, and his ‘Enquiry into the Physical and Literal Sense of Jeremiah viii. 7—the stork in the heaven knoweth her appointed times,’ is reprinted in the ‘Harleian Miscellany,’ 1744 ii. 558–567, 1809 ii. 578–88.

== See also ==
- Johann Baptiste Horvath
- Andreas Jaszlinszky
- Edmond Pourchot
- Pierre Lemonnier
- Philip of the Blessed Trinity
