= Marston Trussell =

Village in Northamptonshire, England

Coordinates: 52.4619°N 0.9837°W

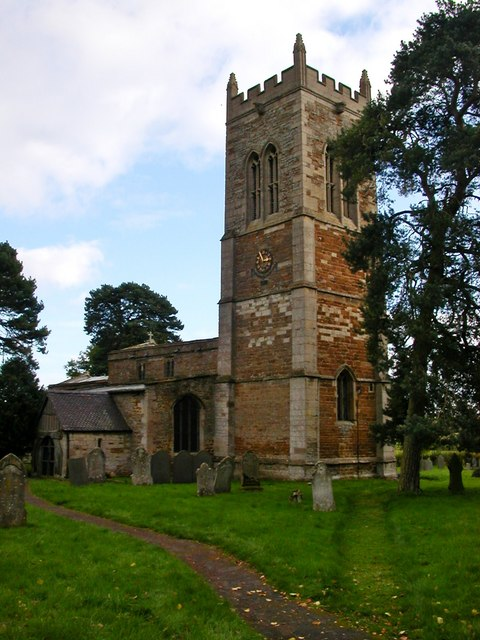
- St Nicholas' Church, Marston Trussell

- Location within Northamptonshire
- Population: 157 (2011)
- OS grid reference: SP6985
- Unitary authority: West Northamptonshire
- Ceremonial county: Northamptonshire
- Region: East Midlands
- Country: England
- Sovereign state: United Kingdom
- Post town: Market Harborough
- Postcode district: LE16
- Dialling code: 01858
- Police: Northamptonshire
- Fire: Northamptonshire
- Ambulance: East Midlands
- UK Parliament: Kettering

Marston Trussell is a village and civil parish in West Northamptonshire in England. Marston Trussell was first recorded as 'Mersitone', meaning marsh settlement. The parish includes Thorpe Lubenham. At the time of the 2001 census, its population was 163 people, reducing slightly to 157 at the 2011 census but including Lubenham.

The villages name means 'Marsh farm/settlement'. The village was held by Richard Trussel in 1233.

The manor house in the village, Marston Trussell Hall, dates from circa 1606 and is an Elizabethan-style mansion with fine wood panelling interiors in the drawing room; in later years the existing house was dwarfed by a Victorian extension which no longer exists. A priesthole was discovered in the mid-1950s. The 12-acre (49,000 m^{2}) grounds of the hall have gardens and a newly added sunken Italian garden. Also of note are the 10 Wellingtonia trees. Richard Trussell was lord of the manor in 1233. The Trussells of Marston died out in the 14th century and the hall was eventually re-established as the seat of the Barwell-Ewins Bennett family. There is a hatchment in the parish church of Henry Barwell who died in 1763.

The River Welland was in flood at the time of the Battle of Naseby in 1645 which led to a massacre of retreating Royalists who were trapped between the river and the church; this area is known locally as Slaughterford field.

The late 17th century wrought-iron carriage gates of Marston Trussell Hall were originally made for the house of Erasmus Norwich at Brampton Ash. They were moved to the entrance of the hall in the mid-1700s. Some of the original wrought-iron railings are still used to partition fields at the hall. However, during the First World War, like many country houses, a lot of the wrought-iron was removed and used in the war effort for the manufacture of arms and munitions.

There are around 60 houses, St Nicholas' Church and a village hall.

The village has a 3-acre (12,000 m^{2}) lake, two minutes walk to the west, which primarily stocks roach, perch and pike.

Alongside the lake resides the cricket pitch. The cricket team was started in the mid-1980s, predominantly playing friendlies on a Sunday. The team at one point could field five sets of brothers, Daniel (now at Wokingham Cricket Club) and Oliver Reddyhough, David and John Reddyhough, Simon and Sam Smith (now Gumley Cricket Club), Charles and Robert Mathew and Shaun and Ashley Burbery.

The village holds an annual Beer Festival, over a weekend in mid-June. The Victorian village hall becomes The Rising Sun (the old village pub, The Sun Inn, closed some time ago), complete with pub sign, hand pumps and a variety of real ales, and ciders, including some from the local Welland Valley vineyard.

The village is now (2017) enabled for high speed ultrafast (over 100 Mbit/s) broadband via Zippynet.

== Notable people ==
Thomas Reynolds (antiquarian)
