= International cricket in 1938–39 =

International cricket season

The 1938–39 international cricket season was from September 1938 to April 1939. The season consisted of a single international tour.

== Season overview ==
International tours
| Start date | Home team | Away team | Results [Matches] | | | |
| Start date | Home team | Away team | Test | ODI | FC | LA |
|---|---|---|---|---|---|---|
| 24 December 1938 | South Africa | England | 0–1 [5] | — | — | — |

== December ==
=== England in South Africa ===
Test series
| No. | Date | Home captain | Away captain | Venue | Result |
|---|---|---|---|---|---|
| Test 267 | 24–28 December | Alan Melville | Wally Hammond | Old Wanderers, Johannesburg | Match drawn |
| Test 268 | 31 Dec–4 January | Alan Melville | Wally Hammond | Newlands, Cape Town | Match drawn |
| Test 269 | 20–23 January | Alan Melville | Wally Hammond | Kingsmead, Durban | England by an innings and 13 runs |
| Test 270 | 18–22 February | Alan Melville | Wally Hammond | Old Wanderers, Johannesburg | Match drawn |
| Test 271 | 3–14 March | Alan Melville | Wally Hammond | Kingsmead, Durban | Match drawn (by agreement) |
