= George Marriott (cricketer) =

English cricketer, clergyman

Personal information
- Full name: George Strickland Marriott
- Born: 7 October 1855; Cotesbach, Leicestershire, England
- Died: 21 October 1905 (aged 50); Sigglesthorne, Yorkshire, England
- Batting: Right-handed
- Bowling: Right-arm roundarm fast
- Relatives: Charles Marriott (brother); Peter Scott (great-nephew); Robert Scott (great-nephew)

Domestic team information
- Years: Team
- 1878: Oxford University

Career statistics
Competition	First-class
Matches	3
Runs scored	21
Batting average	3.50
100s/50s	–/–
Top score	11
Balls bowled	184
Wickets	0
Bowling average	–
5 wickets in innings	–
10 wickets in match	–
Best bowling	–
Catches/stumpings	–/–
- Source: Cricinfo, 12 April 2020

George Strickland Marriott (7 October 1855 – 21 October 1905) was an English first-class cricketer and clergyman.

The son of Reverend James Powell Marriott, he was born in October 1855 at Cotesbach, Leicestershire. He was educated at Winchester College, before going up to Brasenose College, Oxford. While studying at Oxford, he made three appearances in first-class cricket for Oxford University in 1878, playing twice against the Marylebone Cricket Club and once against Cambridge University in The University Match at Lord's. In addition to playing at first-class level, he also played minor matches for Leicestershire, then a second-class county.

After graduating from Oxford, he attended the Leeds Clergy School in 1881. He took holy orders in the Church of England the following year, with him obtaining his first ecclesiastical post as curate of Kirkstall from 1881–83. He moved south in 1884 to Farnham, where he was curate until 1885. He returned to his hometown in 1886, where he held the post of rector until 1897. Moving to Norfolk, he held the posts of rector of Beighton and vicar of Moulton from 1897–99, before becoming the rector of Sigglesthorne in the East Riding of Yorkshire until his death there in October 1905. He was survived by his wife, Gertrude, who he had married in 1885 and their two children. His brother Charles was a first-class cricketer, as were two his nephews, Peter Scott and Robert Scott.
