= Charles Marriott (cricketer, born 1848) =

English cricketer and barrister

Personal information
- Full name: Charles Marriott
- Born: 14 October 1848; Cotesbach, Leicestershire, England
- Died: 9 July 1918 (aged 69); Cotesbach, Leicestershire, England
- Batting: Right-handed
- Bowling: Right-arm slow
- Relatives: George Marriott (brother); Peter Scott (grandson); Robert Scott (grandson)

Domestic team information
- Years: Team
- 1870–1871: Oxford University
- 1870–1882: Marylebone Cricket Club

Career statistics
Competition	First-class
Matches	31
Runs scored	628
Batting average	14.27
100s/50s	–/–
Top score	48
Balls bowled	68
Wickets	1
Bowling average	?
5 wickets in innings	–
10 wickets in match	–
Best bowling	1/?
Catches/stumpings	23/–
- Source: Cricinfo, 6 August 2019

Charles Marriott DL JP (14 October 1848 – 9 July 1918) was an English first-class cricketer and barrister.

== Life ==
The son of the Reverend James Powell Marriott, he was born at Cotesbach in October 1848. Marriott was educated at Winchester College, before going up to Brasenose College, Oxford. While at Oxford, he made his debut in first-class cricket for Oxford University against the Gentlemen of England at Oxford in 1870. He played first-class cricket for Oxford until 1871, making seven appearances.

After graduating from Oxford, he continued to play first-class cricket, playing for the Marylebone Cricket Club (MCC) and the Gentlemen of England regularly from 1872–75, which also included playing for the Gentlemen of the Marylebone Cricket Club against Kent in 1873.

A student of the Inner Temple, Marriott was called to the bar in 1875. His duties as a barrister reduced his participation in first-class cricket, with Marriott making one appearance in 1877 and two in 1879 for I Zingari. Marriott served as the High Sheriff of Leicestershire in 1878. His final appearances in first-class cricket came in 1882, when he appeared five times, including playing for an England XI against the touring Australians, and making two appearances for I Zingari against Yorkshire and the Australians at the Scarborough Festival. In 31 first-class matches, Marriott scored 631 runs at an average of 14.27, with a high score of 48.

In addition to playing first-class cricket, Marriott played minor matches for Leicestershire from 1872–87, prior to their elevation to first-class status. He served as club president on three occasions. In his later years he served several times on the committee of the MCC. Outside of cricket and his legal profession, he also served in the Leicestershire Yeomanry from 1873–83, reaching the rank of captain. He died at Cotesbach in July 1918.

== Family ==
Marriott married, firstly in 1880, Marion (or Marian) Frances Fellowes, daughter of Robert Fellowes of Shotesham Park. They had three children, Evelyn Mary, born 1880, and twins Charles Henry and Violet Ann, born 1882. Marion died on 20 December 1882.#

Marriott married, secondly in 1891, Mary Emily Peach, daughter of the Rev. Charles Pierrepont Peach. They had seven sons and one daughter.

His brother George, and grandsons, Peter Scott and Robert Scott, all played first-class cricket.
