= Cotesbach =

Village in Leicestershire, England

Coordinates: 52.436°N 1.212°W

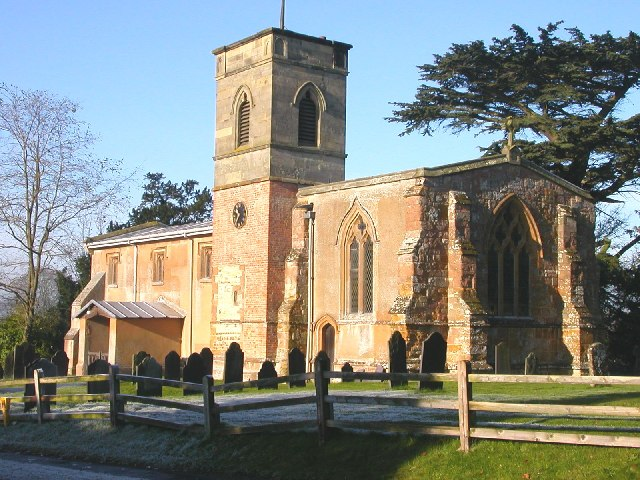
- St Mary’s Church, Cotesbach

- Location within Leicestershire
- Population: 204 (2011 Census)
- OS grid reference: SP537824
- Civil parish: Cotesbach
- District: Harborough
- Shire county: Leicestershire
- Region: East Midlands
- Country: England
- Sovereign state: United Kingdom
- Post town: LUTTERWORTH
- Postcode district: LE17
- Dialling code: 01455
- Police: Leicestershire
- Fire: Leicestershire
- Ambulance: East Midlands
- UK Parliament: South Leicestershire

Cotesbach (/ˈkoʊtsbætʃ/ KOHTS-batch) is a village and civil parish in the Harborough district of Leicestershire, England. The nearest town is Lutterworth, about 1 1/2 miles (2.4 km) to the north. Rugby is 6 miles south of the parish. The River Swift flows through the parish, to the north of the village. The parish is located near the M1, M6 and A5, with the main settlement just off the A426 Rugby Road, which was built to bypass the village. Until the year 2000 the village had a small post-office, operated inside the porch of a resident's cottage.

== History ==
The name 'Cotesbach' is believed to mean the dwelling of a person called 'Cott's', which is next to a valley with a stream. In Middle English 'beche' is translated to mean a river or flow of water in a valley.

Three places in Cotesbach parish are believed to be sites of early settlements of round houses, dating from around 800 to 42 BC. The Roman period saw some changes for Cotesbach, especially with the creation of nearby roads such as Watling Street and Fosse Way. Shards of Roman pottery have been found in the village, leading to people believing that there could have been a Roman villa in the area.

The current site of Cotesbach is believed to have originated from the Saxon period. In this period, Cotesbach was in the 'neutral' area between the Kingdom of Wessex and the Dane Law territory. Many archaeological finds originate from this period, including many brooches, a copper alloy stirrup mount, a small sword/dagger and a shield boss. The Domesday period saw a new Lord of the parish, Hugh de Gretemaisnil (French: Hugues de Grandmesnil) from France. During the Medieval period the population was believed to be around 150 people, who were mostly agricultural workers. Several archaeological finds come from this period, including a piece of decorated tile.

The area had been considerably successful until 1591 when the owner of the land, Robert Devereux, decided to sell large amounts of land to raise funds. Large amounts of land in Cotesbach came into ownership of John Quarles. Quarles raised rent for tenant farmers, purchased other sections of land and began to enclose the common land for farm animals. This upset many local people, who relied on the common land. A petition was taken to King James, who started an enquiry into the events. However, the enquiry resulted in Quarles being given permission to enclose land in 1603. Enclosure of the land occurred across Cotesbach and beyond. Tension peaked in 1607 when the Enclosures Riot occurred, which resulted in people from many rural towns and villages pulling down hedges and fences and opening up the enclosures. In Leicester gallows were installed to try and put off the rioters. By 1609, Cotesbach was a mixture of common and enclosed land. However, in 1612 the land was enclosed again, meaning the agricultural world was changed permanently.

This description of Cotesbach was given in the late nineteenth century:

"A parish in Lutterworth district, Leicester; adjacent to Watling-street and the boundary with Warwick, 1¾ mile SSW of Lutterworth, and 4 SE by S of Ullesthorpe r. station. It has a post office under Lutterworth. Acres, 1, 227. Real property, £2, 327. Pop., 125. Houses, 23. The property is divided among a few".

== Places of interest ==
The Hall was constructed in 1703. It was originally built as a rectory for Reverend Edward Wells. The hall is believed to be built on land which used to contain a farmhouse. Since 1759 when Robert Marriott bought the estate, eight generations of the Marriott family have resided here.

The Manor is the oldest building in Cotesbach to be used as a house and is grade two listed. The manor was re-built around 1630 by George Bennett. The building is on the site of a previous Tudor building. The Manor is made up of many parts from many eras.

The Schoolhouse was constructed by Robert Marriott in the late 18th century to provide a good education to the village children. Around the 1870s the schoolhouse was no longer required because another school opened in nearby Lutterworth. The Cotesbach Educational Trust now has a lease on the building.

St Mary's Church was constructed in the 13th century, however it is believed that a wooden building was on the same site previously. In the late 14th century the bell for the church was cast. In 1702 Dr Edward Wells restored the building. In 1812, £400 was spent on renovating the church after the central tower collapsed, adding a new roof and side tower, and, later on in the century, installing new heating and applying stucco to the outside. 1919 saw a clock added to the church as a memorial to World War One, as well as a stained glass window which was installed in memorial to the two Marriott brothers who lost their lives during the war.

== Demographics ==
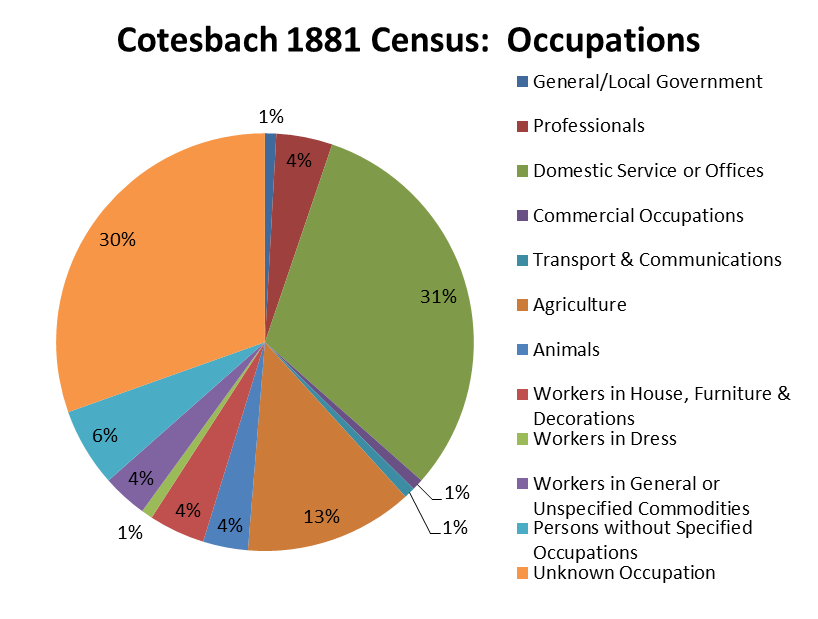
The occupations of residents of Cotesbach Civil Parish, Leicestershire, as reported by the Census of Population from 1881.

The 1881 census reported that the most dominant occupation was domestic service of offices, with 36 people from the parish employed in this sector. 35 people had unknown occupations. 15 people worked in the agricultural sector. Seven people had unspecified occupations. Five people worked in house, furniture and decorations. Five people were classed as 'professionals'. Four people worked in general or unspecified commodities. Four people worked with animals. One person worked in dress, one person in transport/communications, one in commercial occupations and another person in a general/local government role. This shows that the parish was mainly working class, specialising in agriculture, however there were a few members of the middle and upper classes. Women mainly did not have a specified occupation or worked in domestic service, whilst men were mainly working in agriculture, or in domestic service or with animals. This shows the gender divide between men who went out to work on farms, whilst women remained at home or worked as domestic servants in wealthy homes.

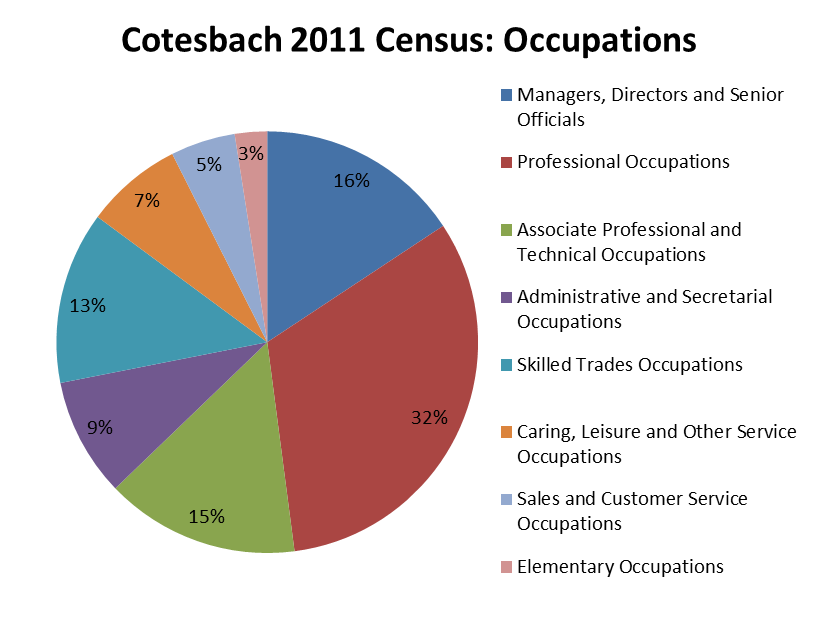
The occupations of residents of Cotesbach Civil Parish, Leicestershire, as reported by the Census of Population from 2011.

The 2011 census reveals a large change in the occupation of residents of Cotesbach from 1881. It reveals that 39 residents work in the 'Professional Occupations' field. 19 people work as managers, directors and senior officials. 18 people are associate professionals and technical professionals. 16 people class themselves as being in a skilled trade occupations. 11 people are working in the administrative and secretarial occupations. Nine people are working in the caring, leisure and other service occupations sector. Six people are working as sales and customer service operators and three people have 'Elementary Occupations'. This shows a move from a mainly agricultural and working class area, to an area mainly for the wealthy and those in professional and skilled occupations.

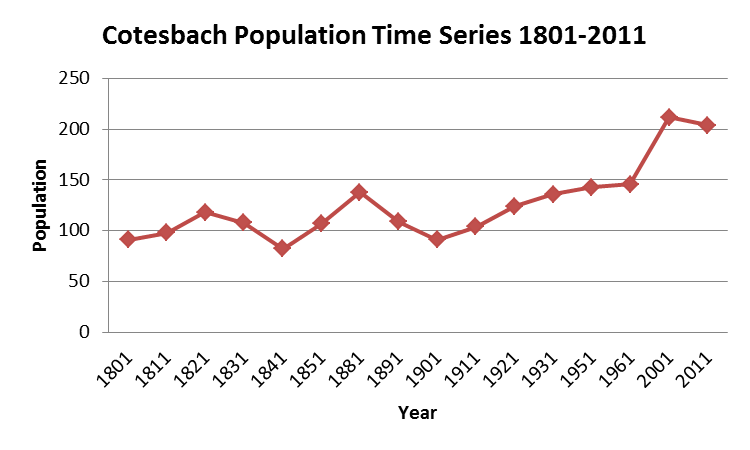
The total population of Cotesbach Civil Parish, Leicestershire, as reported by the Census of Population from 1801 to 2011.

The population of Cotesbach increased from the 1801 census until the 1831 census where there was a decrease in population. This decrease could possibly be due to the industrial revolution, especially with the development of steam power. The population then rose slightly in 1851. In 1881 the population appeared to increase rapidly, however this increase occurred because the boundary for Cotesbach was increased. In the 1891 and 1901 census's the population was decreasing, possibly due to people moving out to industrial cities. By the 1911 census the population began to increase and this trend continued up to the 1961 census, with a population of 146 people. The next census included was in 2001, when the population was 212, continuing the increasing trend. In 2011 the population of the parish had decreased by eight people to 204, possibly due to young people leaving the village for employment.

== Present day ==
The Cotesbach Educational Trust has increased interest in local heritage, helped by the Heritage Lottery Fund donating £570,000 to the Educational Trust to restore three historic buildings including the Schoolhouse as an educational resource centre for heritage, environment and arts.

== Notable people ==
- Charles Marriott (1848–1918), cricketer, barrister and High Sheriff of Leicestershire in 1878
- George Marriott (1855–1905), cricketer and clergyman
- Walter Blith (1605-1664), farmer, writer and an official of the Commonwealth, farmed in Cotesbach
- Rolf Dudley-Williams, of Power Jets lived at 'The Cottage'
