= Peter Scott (cricketer, born 1912) =

English cricketer and soldier

Personal information
- Full name: Peter Marriott Raleigh Scott
- Born: 1 February 1912; Paddington, Middlesex, England
- Died: 13 June 1944 (aged 32); Villers-Bocage, Normandy, France
- Batting: Left-handed
- Bowling: Left-arm fast
- Relatives: Robert Scott (brother); Charles Marriott (grandfather); George Marriott (great-uncle)

Domestic team information
- Years: Team
- 1932–1933: Oxford University

Career statistics
Competition	First-class
Matches	5
Runs scored	114
Batting average	16.28
100s/50s	–/–
Top score	37
Balls bowled	678
Wickets	5
Bowling average	64.20
5 wickets in innings	–
10 wickets in match	–
Best bowling	2/22
Catches/stumpings	1/–
- Source: Cricinfo, 12 April 2020

Peter Marriott Raleigh Scott MC (1 February 1912 – 13 June 1944) was an English first-class cricketer and British Army officer.

The son of Thomas Gilbert Scott, he was born at Marylebone in February 1912. His relatives included his brother Robert, grandfather Charles Marriott and great-uncle George Marriott. He was educated at Winchester College, before going up to Magdalen College, Oxford to study law. While studying at Oxford, he played first-class cricket for Oxford University in 1932 and 1933, making five appearances. Scott scored 114 runs in his five matches, at an average of 16.28 and a high score of 37. With his left-arm fast bowling, he took 5 wickets with best figures of 2 for 22.

Scott married Katherine Nina Grant Smith in 1938. He served in the Second World War, being commissioned as a second lieutenant with the 4th County of London Yeomanry in September 1939. The Yeomanry was sent to the Middle East in early 1941 and from there was transferred to the Western Dersert in June 1942, where Scott saw action at the British defensive lines at Maabus er Rigel and was wounded when his tank was hit by enemy fire. Holding the rank of lieutenant by mid-1942, he was awarded the Military Cross for gallantry in August 1942. He was mentioned in dispatches in December 1942 and assumed command of C Squadron in the Yeomanry in February 1943, at which point he held the temporary rank of captain. In April 1943, now an acting major, Scott took part in the Battle of Wadi Akarit, where his actions commanding tanks across a minefield saw him decorated with a bar to his Military Cross. During the latter stages of the North African campaign, troops commanded by Scott were among the first to enter Tunis during its capture.

Following the conclusion of operations in North Africa, the Yeomanry saw action during the Allied invasion of Italy at Salerno in September 1943, before crossing the Volturno River in October. Scott returned to England with the Yeomanry in December 1943, in order to train other units in preparation for the invasion of German-occupied France. Scott landed at Arromanches on 7 June 1944, one day after the start of the invasion. Six days later the Yeomanry were tasked with the capture of Villers-Bocage. After taking the town, they were halted to its east after being attacked by the 101st SS Heavy Panzer Battalion, during which Scott was killed by a Tiger tank commanded by tank ace Michael Wittmann. He was buried at the Bayeux War Cemetery.
