= Edmond Pourchot =

Professor

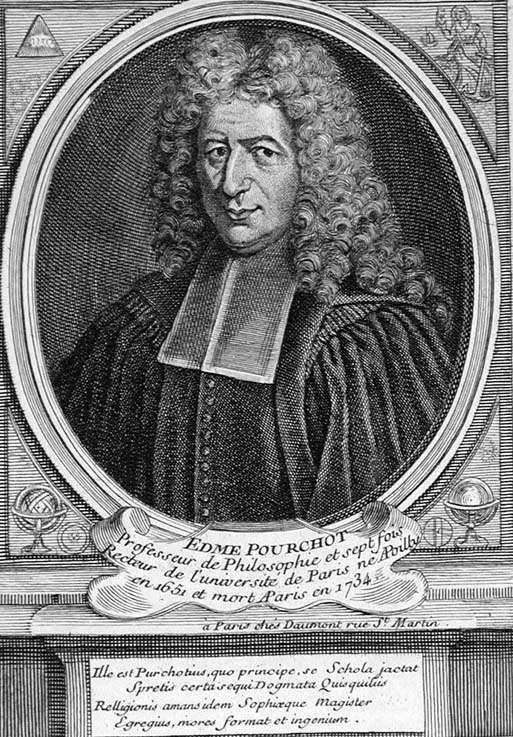
Edmond Pourchot.

Edmond Pourchot (1651, Poilly – 1734, Paris) was a university professor noted for his controversial advocacy of Cartesianism (and the Cartesian theory of mechanics) in place of Aristotelianism. The change within the University of Paris from Aristotelianism to Cartesianism during the 1690s was important in the history of the development of natural philosophy in France and continental Europe.

Pourchot was named Professor of Philosophy in 1677, and he was a long-standing vice-chancellor/rector of the University of Paris, where he taught for 26 years. He authored a popular multi-volume Latin text entitled Institutiones philosophicae ad faciliorem veterum, ac recentiorum philosophorum lectionem comparatae (Paris, 1695; Paris, 1700; Lyon, 1711; Venice, 1715; Lyon, 1716–1717; Venice, 1730 [standard edition]; Paris & Lyon & Padua, 1733; Padua, 1751; Venice, 1755). This text was well regarded among other French intellectuals, and gained followers for Cartesianism in many other countries including Turkey and Poland. He was also a scholar of the Hebrew language. The Latin form of his name was Edmundus Purchotius (Edmundi Purchotii).

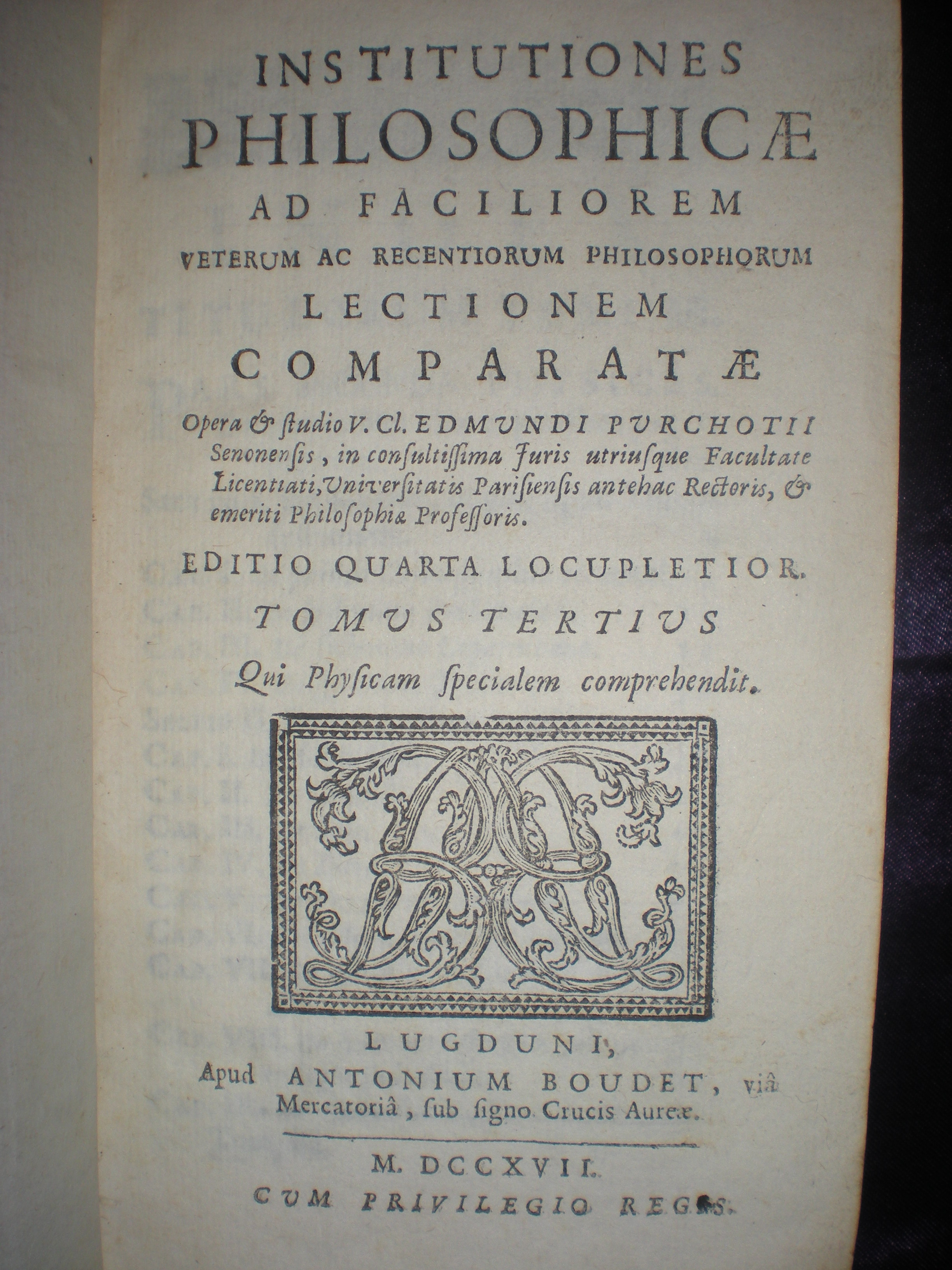
Institutiones Philosophicae (1717).

- Volume 1 - Logic and metaphysics
- Volume 2 - Geometry and general physics (including optics, hydrodynamics, simple machines, thermodynamics, and dynamics featuring projectiles, pendulums, etc.)
- Volume 3 - Cosmology (heliocentric and geocentric), botany, zoology, human anatomy, meteorology, astronomy, magnetism, metallurgy, and geography

1. including a world map showing Terra Australis, the Prime Meridian passing through El Hierro, and the Island of California (Table 24)
2. including a presentation of heliocentric Cartesian ethereal vortices in/around the Solar System (Table 20)... this theory was supported by many notable scientists (for example Christiaan Huygens and Johann Bernoulli) prior to being supplanted by Newtonian mechanics (published 1686)
3. including an armillary sphere showing the plane of the ecliptic on the celestial sphere (Table 16)
4. including an illustration of magnetic field lines which were not fully understood for another 150 years until Faraday and Maxwell (Table 26)

- Volume 4 - Ethics
- Volume 5 - Philosophy (including metaphysics and ontology)

== Plates (Tables 16, 20, 24, 26) from Institutiones Philosophicae (Pourchot, 1717) ==
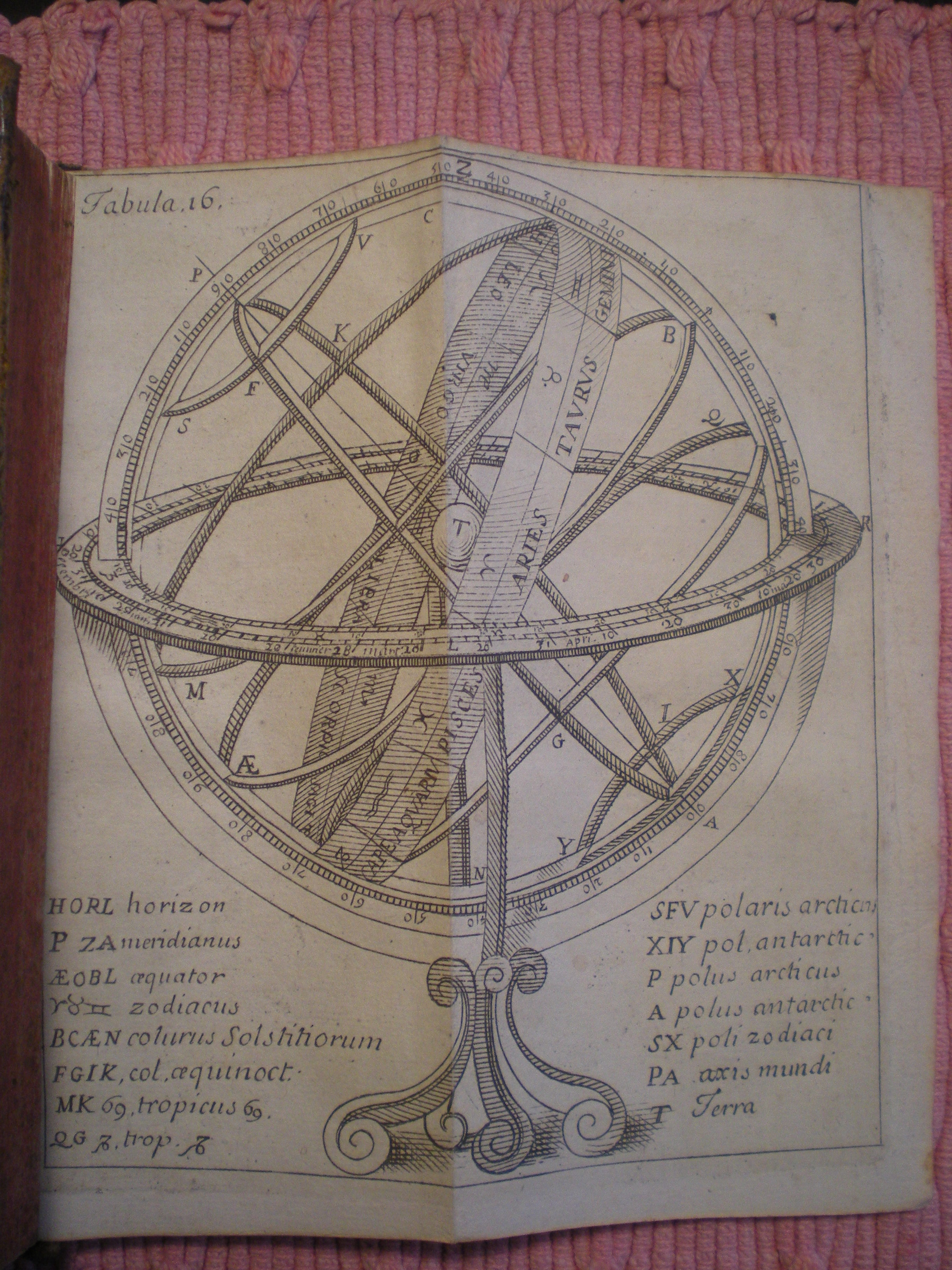
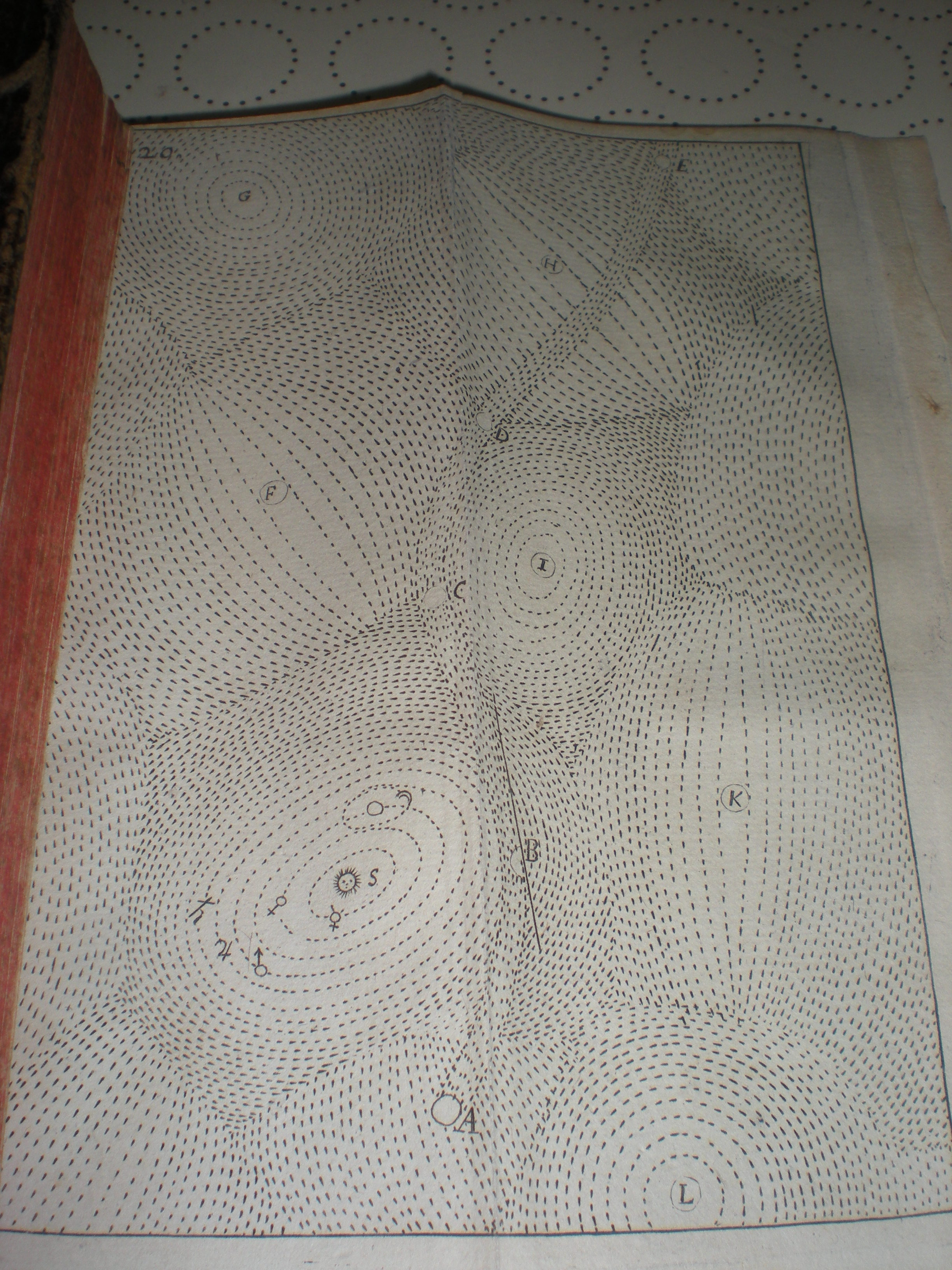
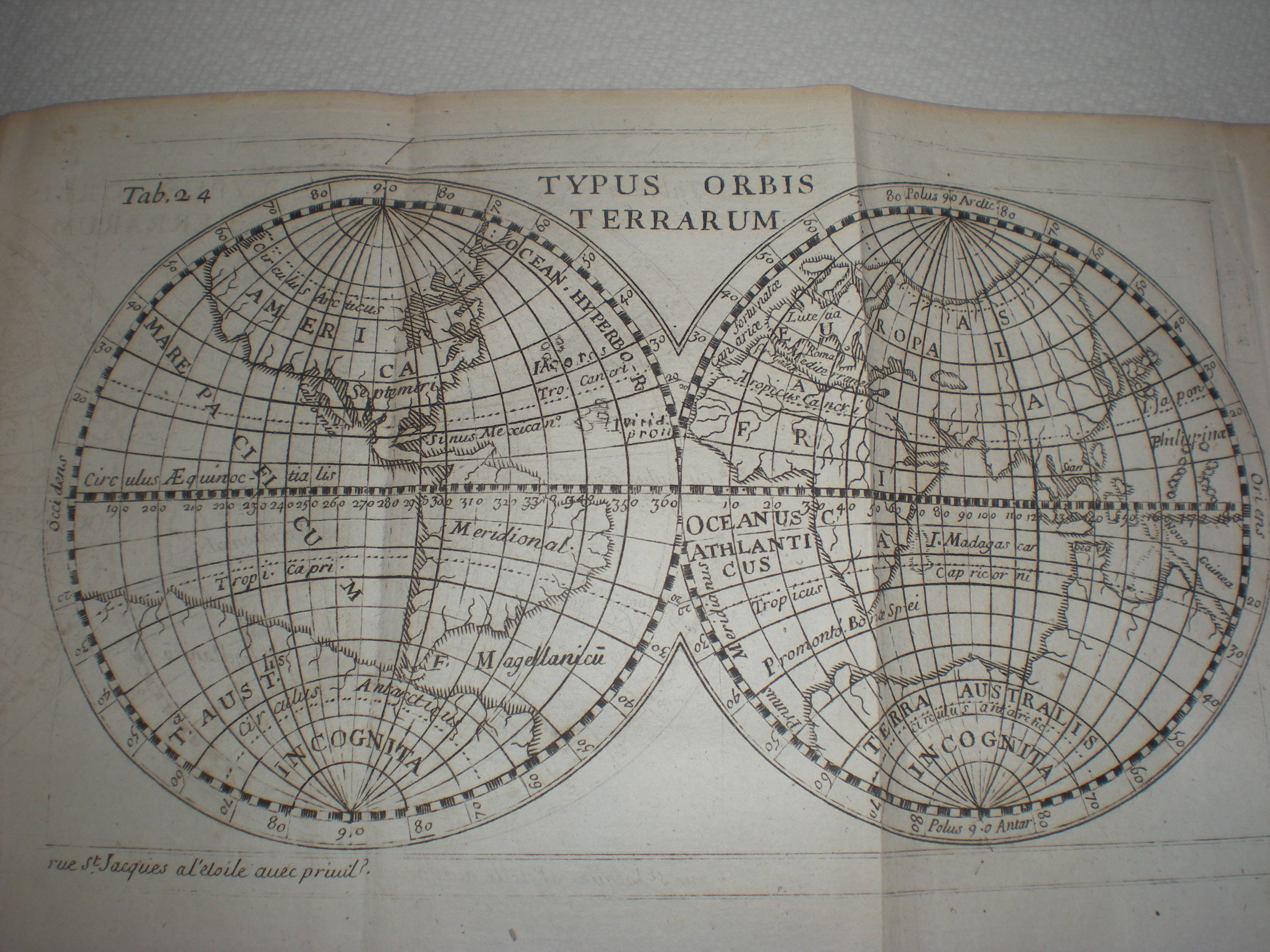
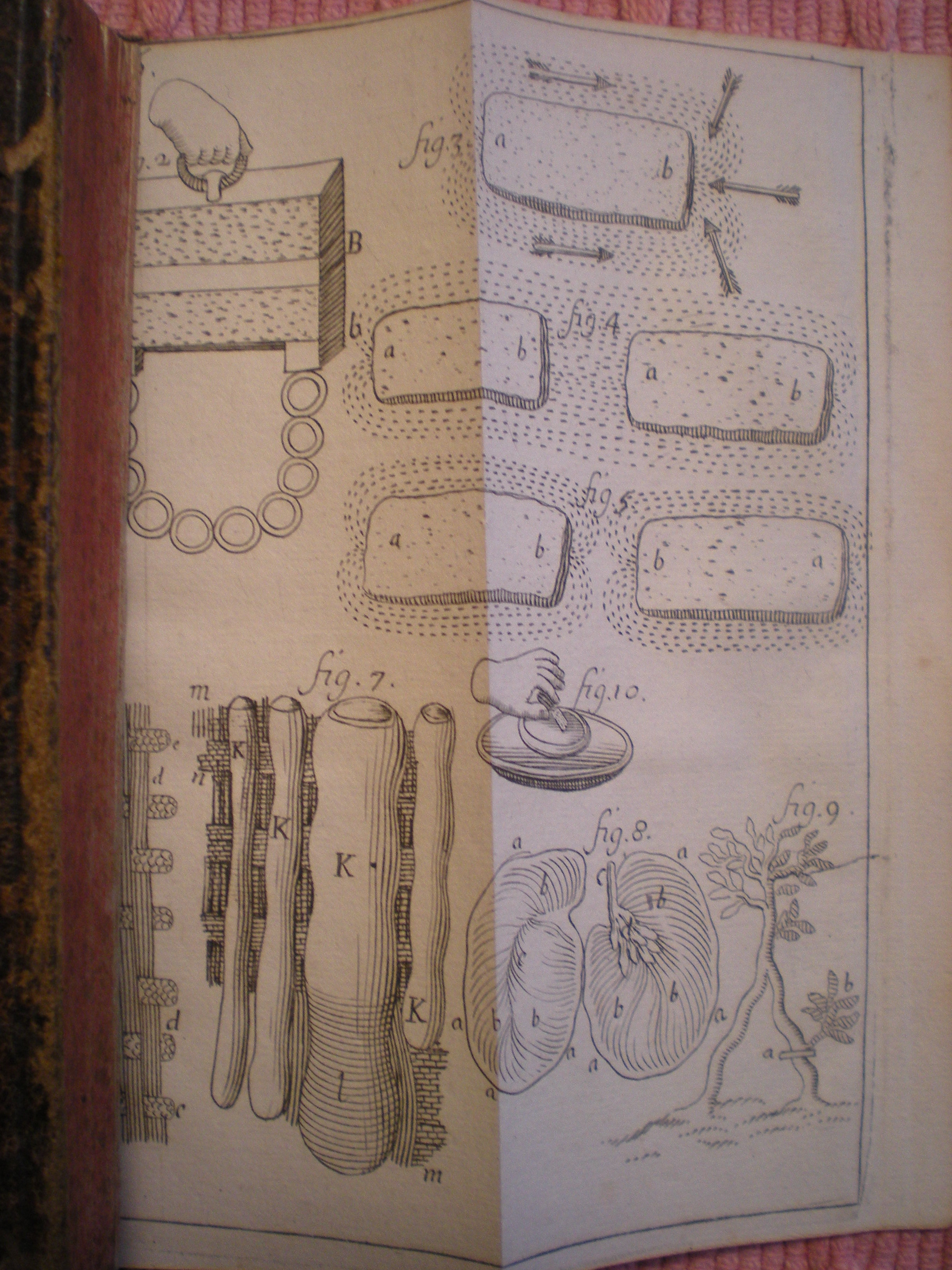

== See also ==
- Johann Baptiste Horvath
- Andreas Jaszlinszky
- Pierre Lemonnier
- Philip of the Blessed Trinity
- Charles Morton
