= Christopher Melville =

South African cricketer

Personal information
- Full name: Christopher Duncan McLean Melville
- Born: 4 October 1935 (age 91); Pietermaritzburg, Natal, South Africa
- Batting: Right-handed
- Bowling: Right-arm medium-pace
- Relatives: Alan Melville (uncle)

Domestic team information
- Years: Team
- 1956 to 1957: Oxford University

Career statistics
Competition	First-class
Matches	12
Runs scored	758
Batting average	39.89
100s/50s	2/3
Top score	142
Balls bowled	658
Wickets	6
Bowling average	61.33
5 wickets in innings	0
10 wickets in match	0
Best bowling	1/19
Catches/stumpings	10/–
- Source: Cricinfo, 21 April 2019

Christopher Duncan McLean Melville (born 4 October 1935) is a former South African first-class cricketer who played for Oxford University in 1956 and 1957.

Melville's uncle was the South African Test captain Alan Melville. Christopher went to school at Michaelhouse before going to Trinity College, Oxford. A middle-order batsman, he was Oxford's most successful batsman in 1957, scoring 715 runs at an average of 37.63, with a highest score of 142, made out of a team total of 262, against Leicestershire.

After he graduated with an honours degree in Jurisprudence, Melville returned to South Africa and joined the Anglo American mining company in Johannesburg.
