= Walter Blith =

Author of books on husbandry

Walter Blith (1605–1654) was an English writer on husbandry and an official under the Commonwealth. His books promoted improvements in techniques, but were suppressed after the 1660 Restoration.

== Family ==
Blith was baptised in Allesley, Warwickshire, as the fourth and youngest son of John Blith (died 1626), yeoman, a prosperous cereal and dairy farmer, and Ann, daughter of Barnaby Holbeche of Birchley Hall, Fillongley. Walter's elder brother Francis became a lawyer and married into the gentry. Blith and his wife Hannah, daughter of John Waker of Snitterfield, near Stratford upon Avon had three sons and four daughters.

== Career ==
Blith farmed his land diligently and carefully. During the English Civil War he became a captain in the parliamentary army and also solicitor and sequestrator of royalist land in Warwickshire and Coventry, as well as a rent collector from lands of the bishop and dean and chapter of Worcester, and in 1649 and 1650 a surveyor of confiscated crown lands in Bedfordshire, Cambridgeshire, Huntingdonshire and Norfolk. He himself bought confiscated crown land at Potterspury, Northamptonshire and was described in the conveyance as a gentleman of Cotesbach, Leicestershire.

Blith was living at Cotesbach when he made his will in 1650. He died in Lincolnshire, leaving sums between £260 and £340 apiece to his children, to be employed "either in a way of grazing or merchandizing". He was a member of the circle around Samuel Hartlib, the polymath, who described him as a "very loving and experienced friend".

== Writings ==
Blith's books on husbandry show notable good sense, based on the author's and others' farming experience. He presents his judgements and opinions carefully, and made textual changes in subsequent editions to describe new farming practices. His The English Improver, or, A New Survey of Husbandry was dedicated to both houses of Parliament and to the "ingenuous reader". A second edition appeared in the same year, and third, "much augmented" in 1652, with a second part containing "Six Newer Pieces of Improvement". This was dedicated to Cromwell, the council of state, nobility, gentry, soldiers, husbandmen, cottagers, labourers, and the meanest commoner. The new information concerned new crops such as woad, clover, sainfoin, lucerne, etc. Yet another edition appeared in 1653. Blith intended to write a further book on animal husbandry, but apparently did not complete it. His Parliamentarian sympathies prevented any of his work reappearing after the Restoration of 1660.

The books were written "in our own natural country language and in our ordinary and usual home-spun terms". He urged agricultural improvement, but showed less enthusiasm for enclosure, through his concern for the poor: enclosure should not be allowed to cause depopulation. Blith's views almost certainly reflect discussion with Joseph Lee, the pamphleteer and advocate of enclosure, who was rector of Cotesbach. Enclosure had in fact caused turmoil in the village in 1603 and made it a centre of the Midland revolt of 1607. Though Blith showed sympathy for the common man and understood the aspirations of the Diggers, he did not think the latter were realistic.

Blith's work also bore a religious message, holding up "the examples of biblical husbandmen and improvers, from Adam to Solomon, as well as that of God himself, 'the great Husbandman' (English Improver, p. 4), who had first made plants and trees come forth upon the earth. God intended the preservation of his creation, Blith suggested, and mankind was the instrument by which he would achieve this. For Blith, therefore, the historical examples of the Bible taught the lesson that individuals had a duty to God to practise a reformed husbandry, and that only by doing this might their country be redeemed from sin, famine, and warfare into a new Eden of peace and plenty.

Blith's ideas brought some improvement in techniques, but the period of peace under the Commonwealth was short-lived, and general, substantial improvement had to wait for the Agricultural Revolution of the next century.
