= Robert Scott (cricketer) =

English cricketer

Personal information
- Full name: Robert Strickland Gilbert Scott
- Born: 26 April 1909; Paddington, London, England
- Died: 26 August 1957 (aged 48); Paddington, London, England
- Batting: Right-handed
- Bowling: Right-arm fast-medium
- Role: All-rounder
- Relatives: Peter Scott (brother); Charles Marriott (grandfather)

Domestic team information
- Years: Team
- 1930–1931: Oxford University
- 1931–1934: Sussex
- FC debut: 31 May 1930 Oxford Univ. v Glamorgan
- Last FC: 30 May 1939 Free Foresters v Oxford Univ.

Career statistics
Competition	First-class
Matches	86
Runs scored	2,042
Batting average	19.82
100s/50s	2/7
Top score	116
Balls bowled	9,125
Wickets	134
Bowling average	26.82
5 wickets in innings	5
10 wickets in match	0
Best bowling	6/64
Catches/stumpings	53/–
- Source: CricketArchive, 16 May 2013

Robert Strickland Gilbert Scott (26 April 1909 – 26 August 1957) played first-class cricket for Oxford University and Sussex between 1930 and 1934. A right-handed middle-order batsman and a right-arm fast-medium bowler, he was Sussex captain in a few matches in 1932 and regularly in 1933, at first unofficially because of the ill-health of K. S. Duleepsinhji, and then as the official captain later in the 1933 season.

== Family and education ==
Robert Scott was the elder son of the stockbroker Thomas Gilbert Scott who set up a country house cricket ground at Pelsham, near Peasmarsh, East Sussex, that hosted an annual cricket festival which attracted some Test players and also staged warm-up matches for touring teams in the 1920s and early 1930s.

Robert Scott was educated at Winchester College where he was captain of the cricket eleven. He then went to Magdalen College, Oxford, in autumn 1928, and the following April in the Easter vacation he went on an amateurs' cricket tour of Egypt organised by Hubert Martineau. On his return, he played in the freshmen's trial match for the Oxford University side, but was not then picked for any of the first-class matches in the 1929 season.

== First-class cricket ==
Scott's experience in 1930 was, up to a point, similar to that of 1929. He went on a second Martineau tour of Egypt at Easter, and returned to an Oxford trial match where he again did not distinguish himself. But this time at the end of May 1930 he was handed his first-class debut for Oxford University in a match against Glamorgan; however, he scored only 4 and 6 and he failed to take a wicket. He was dropped from the team after this, but returned to first-class cricket a week later when he played for the Free Foresters amateur team against the university: used as an opening batsman, he scored 26 and 15 and took his first wicket, that of Alan Melville. It was not enough to earn a recall to the Oxford side, however.

Scott finally broke through to regular first-class cricket in 1931. In the seniors' trial match he top-scored with 65 and took two wickets, and he then played in all of the university's 12 first-class matches as a lower middle-order batsman and bowler. In an Oxford side with a strong batting line-up led by Melville and the Nawab of Pataudi, Scott made occasional useful scores, with a best of 61 against H. D. G. Leveson Gower's XI. But his Blue was based on usefulness as a bowler and he proved it in the University Match against Cambridge University. The match was dominated by two record-breaking batting performances as first Alan Ratcliffe, the Cambridge opening batsman, scored the first-ever double-century in the University Match with 201, and then the Nawab of Pataudi bettered that with 238 not out; Scott was the only Oxford bowler in Cambridge's first innings to restrain the batsmen and he recorded figures of six wickets for 64 runs from 33.2 overs, which remained the best of his first-class cricket career. He then took two further wickets as Cambridge collapsed in the second innings to leave Oxford just 55 runs for an easy victory.

After graduation, Scott played in a single County Championship match for Sussex at the start of August 1931 and then in an end-of-season festival match for a team called "The Rest" against players who had been on the South African tour in 1930–31, though in neither match did he make much impact.

== County cricketer and captain ==
Scott played a full season of county cricket for Sussex in 1932, usually opening the bowling alongside Maurice Tate and batting at No 7 or 8 in a side full of runs. He contributed both runs and wickets: in all games he scored 838 runs at an average of 24.64 and took 67 wickets at 21.98. In the match against Northamptonshire at Northampton, he made 116 out of 169 in exactly 100 minutes, hitting seven sixes, all of them off Vallance Jupp, and 11 fours; it was his first century and it remained his highest first-class score. Late in the season, the Sussex captain Duleepsinhji, whose health had long been fragile, was forced to stand down and Scott, as the only regular amateur cricketer in the team – Melville was playing for Sussex at this point, but was still a student at Oxford – took over as captain. Sussex had been in with a chance of their first victory in the County Championship until late in the season; in the event, they subsided a little with the departure of Duleepsinhji, but still finished second.

Duleepsinhji was expected to return in 1933 and went to a Swiss clinic for treatment in the 1932–33 off-season. But his condition worsened and it became apparent first that he would not return to Sussex in the 1933 season and then that he would be unable to come back to cricket at all. Scott, though one of the younger regular members of the team – only John Langridge, James Cornford and George Cox Jr. were younger – was the only amateur and was at first stand-in captain and, later in the season, appointed to succeed Duleepsinhji. Wisden Cricketers' Almanack wrote that "gaining experience day after day (he) became, long before the end of the summer, a most capable leader". Sussex finished second in the Championship again and won both the home and away games against Yorkshire, the Champions. Cornford's emergence as a fast-medium bowler meant that Scott bowled much less in 1933 than he had done in 1932, and his tally of wickets fell to just 22; his batting total fell too, to 599 runs at an average of just over 16. He scored a second first-class century with an innings of 113 against Hampshire in which he contributed all 44 runs in the last-wicket partnership.

== The end of regular cricket and thereafter ==
The death of his father in August 1933 brought an abrupt end to Scott's cricket career. As the elder son and with a sister who had been incapacitated in a riding accident, Scott took over the running of the Pelsham estate and had little time for cricket. He played just four matches for Sussex in 1934 and appeared for Free Foresters in matches against Oxford University in 1934, 1938 and 1939.

Outside cricket, he was chairman of the Siamese Tin Syndicate, a Justice of the Peace and High Sheriff of Sussex. After the Second World War he revived the Pelsham cricket week at his house in East Sussex that had been run by his father 30 years earlier. He died in hospital in London aged 48 after what an obituarist called "a severe operation".
