= Gumley =

Village in Leicestershire, England

Coordinates: 52.504528°N 1.000130°W

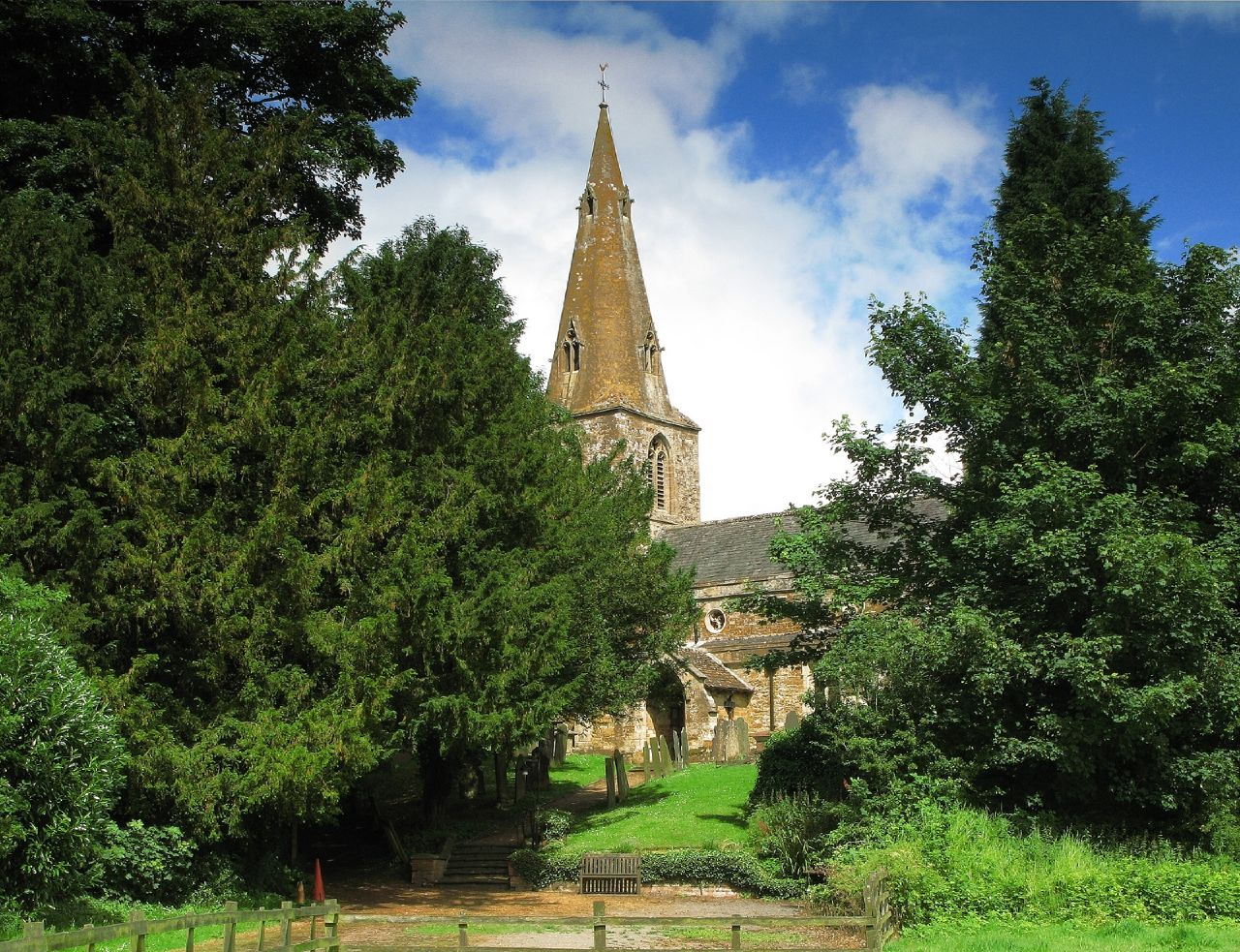
- St Helen's Church, Gumley

- Location within Leicestershire
- Population: 209 (2011)
- OS grid reference: SP6817190018
- District: Harborough
- Shire county: Leicestershire
- Region: East Midlands
- Country: England
- Sovereign state: United Kingdom
- Post town: MARKET HARBOROUGH
- Postcode district: LE16
- Dialling code: 01858
- Police: Leicestershire
- Fire: Leicestershire
- Ambulance: East Midlands
- UK Parliament: Harborough, Oadby and Wigston

Gumley is a village and civil parish in the Harborough district, in the county of Leicestershire, England, United Kingdom. The closest town is Market Harborough. The population of the civil parish (including Laughton) at the 2011 census was 209.

The name Gumley is a contraction of the Anglo-Saxon Gutmundesleah – meaning Godmund's clearing.

== History ==
The village is first mentioned in 749. King Æthelbald of Mercia (r.716-757) held a synod at Gumley in that year, at the instigation of Saint Boniface, to answer accusations that he had been oppressing churches and monasteries. The outcome was that Æthelbald released the Church from all public burdens except the three common burdens of providing military service, and building and repairing bridges and fortresses. These obligations arguably initiated changes in the land tenurial system of England and eventually led to serfdom.

King Offa visited Gumley in 772 and 779 for the witanagemot of the kings of Mercia. On the south side of Gumley Covert there is a pond called "the Mot" which may be an Anglo-Saxon site. The pond stands in a small natural amphitheatre near a mound surmounted with trees.

After the Norman Conquest Gumley was given to Countess Judith, the Conqueror's niece. At that time there were twenty inhabitants. In the medieval period there were dwellings below the village towards Thornhill Farm, of which little remains apart from some surface irregularities and cobbles on the footpath passing by Too Cottage. There were also houses by the 'holloways' in Crow Spinney beside the parish church.

Gumley's population peaked in 1821 when 281 residents were engaged working the land as well as making lace and stockings. Now there are about 105 people on the electoral roll.

Because Gumley has been surrounded by pasture predominantly, the medieval ridge and furrow method of working the land is particularly well preserved and its fields are subject to preservation orders.

== Gumley Hall ==
Gumley Hall was built in 1764 for Joseph Cradock (d. 1826). It consists of a large three-storey red-brick central block, flanked by two-storey pavilions connected to the main block by quadrant walls. Internally many of the features, including the main staircase with its cast-iron balustrade, appear to date from the earlier 19th century. These were probably inserted between 1823 and 1833 by Sir Edmund Cradock-Hartopp who apparently took over the house in an unfinished condition. South of the hall and opening upon the village street the red-brick stables built round a courtyard were erected by Capt. Whitmore; the clock tower in the style of an Italian campanile bears the inscription Incorrupta Fides and a weathercock dated 1870.

Cradock laid out the gardens and plantations of Gumley Hall in imitation of the Parc de Saint-Cloud, and in the summer months they became a fashionable resort for the gentry of Leicester, particularly those who came to take the mineral waters of its 'spa', a chalybeate spring found in 1789.

Cradock moved in the literary society of Oliver Goldsmith, Samuel Johnson, and Edmund Burke, and built a theatre at Gumley which was used for amateur productions and by David Garrick. The owners of Gumley Hall in the 19th century, were not always resident. There were at least two periods when the hall was in the hands of tenants - the 1860s and the 1890s. The Cradock-Hartopps let it to Lt.-Col. Dottin Maycock (1816–79) before he moved to Foxton Lodge, and then to Viscount Ingestre (1830–77) before he succeeded as 19th Earl of Shrewsbury in 1868.

After many structural alterations in 1869-70, the new owner, Capt. Whitmore, came into residence. From c. 1890, when he moved to Essex, he let the hall to a succession of tenants: Thomas Keay Tapling (1855–91), M.P. for South Leicestershire; James Coats (1834–1913), of J. & P. Coats, Ltd; and from 1893 Mrs Emma Bellville, who afterwards moved to Stoughton Grange. In 1897 the hall was bought by the Murray Smiths, who lived there until 1940. One of their governesses was Evelyn Cheesman, later a celebrated entomologist and traveller. G. A. Murray Smith then moved into the Rectory, which was no longer required by the incumbent.

During the Second World War the Hall was used to train resistance fighters and Special Operations Executive and afterwards Leonard Cheshire was given the use of the Hall for those servicemen returning homeless after demobilisation. The Hall became increasingly dilapidated and was demolished in 1964.

== Other buildings ==
St Helen's Church mostly dates from the 14th century with later additions. The tenor bell was cast around 1520. The interior of the church was restored in the Victorian era in 1874 and is a good example of the Decorated style. There is a service every Sunday with a family service once a month.

At the Engine House gas was manufactured for the Hall. There was a Post Office and part of the bakery remains as outbuildings of Westfield. The butchers shop was at the 'Js' where it was preserved as a museum until recently. There were two public houses in the 1840s, the Hartopp Arms and the Bluebell, which later became The Bell. Only two of seven farms in Gumley are left.

Grade II listed structures in the village include Hall Farm, Rose Cottage and Fenleigh House, Stone House, Leys Farm and the village pump. The Motte Castle, a tree-ringed mound to the west of Gumley is a Scheduled Monument.

The village hall was opened in 1969 on the site of Gumley's former school, which closed in 1933. It is run as a charitable trust and has a small committee open to anyone from the village who cares to join. There is a fish and chips evening in February and a summer barbecue in August as well as other social events.

== Village activities ==
Gumley Women's Institute was founded in 1918 and is one of the oldest in the whole country. Meetings are still held most months in the Village Hall.

The Fernie Hunt, founded in 1853, traditionally holds its opening meet in Gumley in October.

Gumley Cricket Club is the village cricket team. The club has two senior teams, the Saturday XI currently play in the Leicestershire and Rutland Cricket League and a Sunday XI team that play friendly fixtures against an established selection of clubs.

== Notable people ==
- John Henry Overton (1835 – 1903), cleric and church historian
- Thomas Horton (soldier) (1603 – 1649), Roundhead soldier
- Andrew Matthews (entomologist) (1815 – 1897), clergyman and entomologist
- Morton Eden, 1st Baron Henley (1752 – 1830), diplomat
- Thomas Tapling (30 October 1855 – 11 April 1891) businessman, politician and philatelist
- Alfred Coleman (cricketer)
