= St Nicholas' Church, Marston Trussell =

Church in Northamptonshire, England

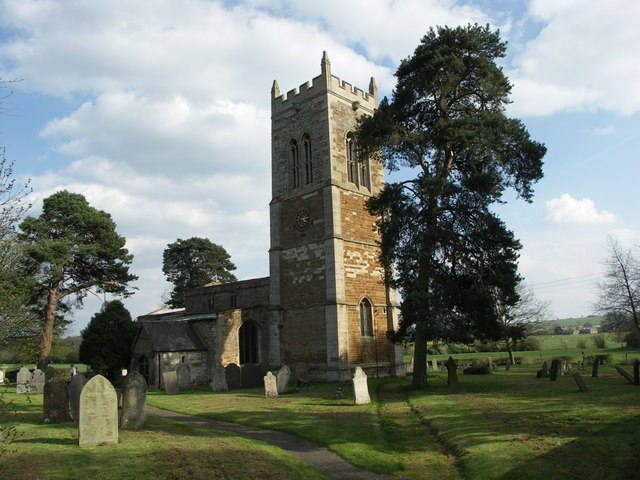
- St Nicholas' Church, Marston Trussell
- 52.4669°N 0.9804°W
- Denomination: Church of England

Administration
- Province: Canterbury
- Diocese: Diocese of Peterborough
- Archdeaconry: Northampton
- Deanery: Brixworth

Clergy
- Vicar: Rev Janet Donaldson

St Nicholas's Church is an Anglican church and the parish church of Marston Trussell in Northamptonshire, England. It is a Grade I listed building and stands on the south side of Lubenham Road at the eastern edge of the village.

The record made in 1086 for Marston Trussell in the Domesday Book does not mention the presence of a priest or a church.

The main structure of the present building was erected in the 13th and 14th centuries. It now consists of a nave, north and south aisles, chancel and west tower. A detailed description appears on the Historic England website.

The parish registers survive from 1561, the historic registers being deposited at Northamptonshire Record Office.

Marston Trussell is part of a united benefice along with Sibbertoft and Welford. Each parish retains its own church building.
