= Gumley Cricket Club =

Amateur club in Leicestershire, England

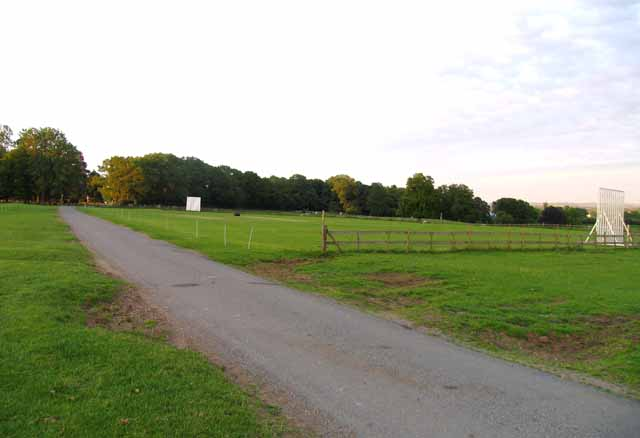
- Gumley Top Cricket Ground (2013)
- League: Leicestershire & Rutland Cricket League

Team information
- Founded: 1977
- Home ground: Gumley Top, Gumley
- Official website: Gumley Cricket Club

Gumley Cricket Club is an amateur cricket club based in Gumley, Leicestershire, England. The club has three senior teams. The Saturday XI, having traditionally played friendlies, started playing competitive cricket in 2009, in the Northamptonshire Cricket League. A Sunday XI side plays friendly fixtures against an established selection of clubs in and around the region. A Midweek XI compete in the Market Harborough District Midweek Evening League and Knockout competitions.

== Gumley Top ==
Gumley is a small village in South East Leicestershire, 4 miles north west of Market Harborough. Gumley cricket field is situated in the middle of the scheduled remains of the Gumley medieval settlement on the North West edge of the village, on a picturesque position along the gated road to Laughton. The field has extensive views of the valley looking South from the pavilion, and is characterised by the road which bisects a small portion of the outfield between the square and the pavilion. Motorists are relatively few on this particular stretch, but those that do arrive during a game are politely asked by way of a sign to wait until the end of the over.

== History ==
There's a long history of cricket in Gumley, with reference to matches as early as the mid 19th century. One account, reported in the Leicester Chronicle in 1873 recorded a match between Kibworth and Gumley regressing into a brawl between the two teams, fueled in part by the presence of alcohol. However, facilities and decorum have improved markedly over the years. A concerted effort by several club members have raised the quality of the square and fund raising efforts have yielded many improvements to the pavilion, in particular a much needed new roof.

== Touring ==
The club arranges an annual tour of 4 matches on consecutive days from the Thursday after the late May Bank Holiday. Past venues include: Margate, Braintree, Barnstaple, Havant, Harrogate, etc. The tour has been a regular feature of the club calendar since 2000.

== Performance ==
Key
Gold	Champions
Red	Relegated
Grey	League suspended

Key
10	Division Ten
11	Division Eleven
12	Division Twelve
13	Division Thirteen

Key
C3S	Championship 3 South
7E	Division 7 East
8E	Division 8 East
9E	Division 9 East

The Northamptonshire Cricket League competition results showing the club's position (by Division) since 2008.

Northamptonshire Cricket League
	2008	2009	2010	2011	2012	2013	2014	2015	2016
1st XI	13	13	12	11	10	10	10	10	10

The Leicestershire & Rutland Cricket League competition results showing the club's position (by Division) since 2017.

Leicestershire & Rutland Cricket League
Team	2017	2018	2019	2020	2021	2022	2023	2024	2025	2026
1st XI	9E	8E	8E		8E	8E	8E	8E	7E	C3S

== Honours ==
Leicestershire & Rutland Cricket League
Division 9 (Note: Division 9 (East).)	Champions	2017

Northamptonshire Cricket League
Division 10	Champions	2015
Division 12	Champions	2010
Division 13	Champions	2009

Market Harborough & District Evening League
Division 1	Champions	1998, 2003, (Note: Shared.) 2004
Division 2	Champions	1997

Cup Competitions
Winners	Market Harborough District Cup	2009
Winners	Holkham Hall 6-a-side Cup	2004, 2005, 2006
Winners	Houghton on the Hill Millennium Cup	2000
Winners	Everard's Cup	1988

== Captains ==
The club appoints a separate Captain for each of its three teams. Captain since 1977 are as follows:

Saturday XI

- David Holyland 1977–1985
- David Bromley 1985–1996
- Simon Cohen 1996–2002
- Matt Wilson 2002–2007
- Ben Wilson 2007–2008
- Joe Hallam 2009–present

Sunday XI

- David Holyland 1977–1985
- David Bromley 1985–1996
- Ken Woolnough 1996–2002
- Simon Cohen 2002–2004
- Joly Pickering 2007–2008
- Richard Davies 2009–present

Midweek XI

- Simon Cohen 1994–2000
- Chris Sleath 2000–2001
- Joly Pickering 2001–2003
- David Krause 2003–2003
- Anthony Masic 2003–2004
- Joly Pickering 2004–2008
- Steven Masic 2009–present

== Officials ==
Since 1977 are as follows:

Secretary

- John Bundey 1977–1983
- Adam Burdett 1993–1996
- David Bromley 1996–2004
- Dennis Pickering 2004–2009
- Toby Pickering 2009–present

Treasurer

- David Holyland 1977–1982
- Tony Masic 1982–1989
- David Bromley 1989–2008
- Tony Masic 2004–2008
- Ben Hunt 2008–2010
- Glynn Marshall 2010–present

Fixture Secretary

- Peter Pickering 1977–2007
- Steven Masic 2007–present

== Awards ==
Performance prizes awarded at the end of each season since 2000 are as follows:

Best Batsman

- 2008 ?
- 2009 Alan Pickering

Best Bowler

- 2008 ?
- 2009 Peter Pickering

Best Fielder

- 2007 Richard Krause
- 2008 Glynn Marshall
- 2009 Dennis Pickering

Best Young Player

- 2008 Daniel Masic
- 2009 Luke Masic

Best League Batsman

- 2009 Joe Hallam

Best League Bowler

- 2009 ?

Best Midweek Player

- 2007 ?
- 2008 ?

Merit Award

- 2008 Dennis Pickering
- 2009 Joe Hallam

== Regular events ==
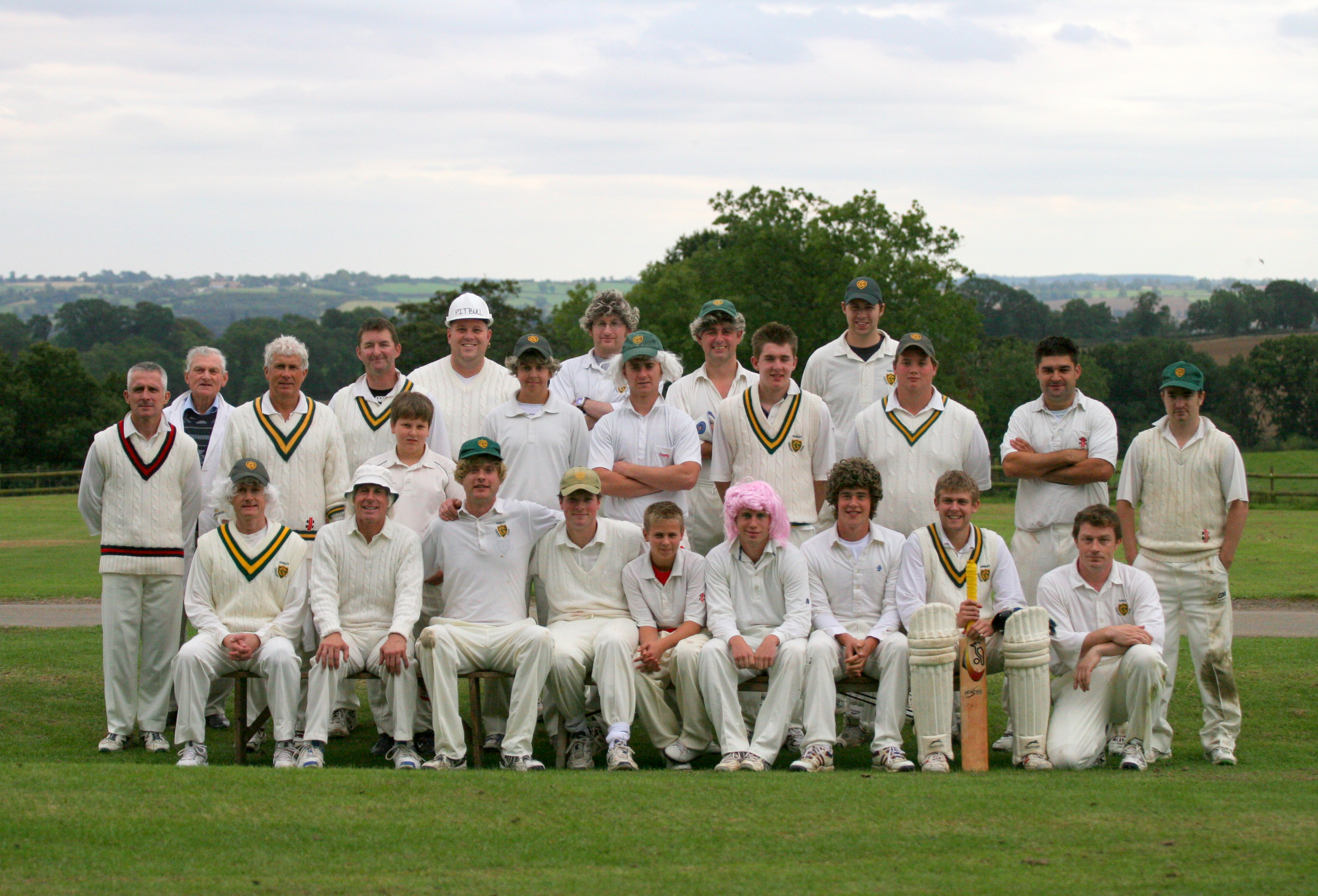
Club Day 2007 - some end of season fun

The club runs a range of events throughout the year. On the cricket side, the intra-club Twenty20 day has proved very popular. The last game of each season is the keenly fought Club Match. This has traditionally been a Saturday vs Sunday affair, but with the better players gravitating to the League side, a new format was introduced in 2009 of 'Greys' (being over 35) vs 'Kids'. A recent addition to the calendar is Presidents Day. This is seen as an opportunity to say 'thank you' to our benefactors and features the Sunday team taking on a Select XI.

Away from cricket, a variety of social and fund-raising events are held throughout the year, ranging from golf days to millionaires evenings and race nights. The club arranges a fireworks display each Guy Fawkes night, in conjunction with the local Scout troop. This event regularly attracts a very large audience from the surrounding villages.

== See also ==
- Club cricket
