= Thomas Reynolds (minister) =

Thomas Reynolds (1752–1829) was an English antiquarian and minister.

== Biography ==
Born in 1752, he was the son of Joseph Reynolds, a clergyman, of Marston Trussell, Northamptonshire, and belonged to the family of Dr. Edward Reynolds, bishop of Norwich. He matriculated from Lincoln College, Oxford, on 18 October 1769, and graduated with a B.A. in 1773, M.A. in 1777. In 1776 he was presented to the rectory of Little Bowden, Northamptonshire, which he held till his death, and to the vicarage of Dunton Bassett, Leicestershire, which he resigned in 1802. He was also vicar of Lubbenham from 1787 to 1800.

Reynolds died on 24 December 1829. He had married early in life. His eldest son, Joseph, died in 1805, in his nineteenth year.

== Works ==
Reynolds wrote on Roman antiquities in The Gentleman's Magazine, and in 1794 communicated to Nichols, for his History of Leicestershire, observations on the Foss and Via Devana (vol. i. p. cliv) and remarks on Lubbenham and Farndon camps (ii. 700).

His major work was Iter Britanniarum; or that part of the Itinerary of Antoninus which relates to Britain, with a new Comment, Cambridge University Press, 1799. The book was severely handled in the British Critic in an article attributed to Whitaker. Reynolds had collected and arranged the material that had accumulated since the publication of John Horsley's Britannia; and William Bennet, bishop of Cloyne, who examined the proof-sheets, declared that the author had made many ingenious observations, though he had the odd idea that he could judge better of Roman roads ‘by consulting books in his closet than by examining them on the spot’.
