= Denny Moore =

American linguist (born 1944)

- Born: 1944 (age 81–82)
- Education: University of Michigan; City University of New York (PhD)
- Occupations: Linguist; anthropologist

Denny Moore (born 1944) is an American linguist, and anthropologist.

He graduated from the University of Michigan, and from the City University of New York with a Ph.D. in Anthropology. He has worked for the Brazilian National Council for Scientific and Technological Development, and is Coordinator of the Linguistics Division, Museu Paraense Emilio Goeldi, Belem-Para, Brazil. He published a grammar of Gavião, a Brazilian Amazonian language. He is on the advisory board of the Center for Amazon Community Ecology.

== Awards ==
- 1999 MacArthur Fellows Program

== Works ==
- "Endangered Languages of Lowland Tropical South America", Language diversity endangered, Editor Matthias Brenzinger, Walter de Gruyter, 2007 ISBN 978-3-11-017050-4
