= Denis Moore (cricketer) =

English cricketer

Personal information
- Full name: Denis Neville Moore
- Born: 26 September 1910; Tewkesbury, Gloucestershire, England
- Died: 2 October 2003 (aged 93); Croydon, Surrey, England
- Batting: Right-handed
- Role: Batsman

Domestic team information
- Years: Team
- 1930–1931: Oxford University
- 1930–1936: Gloucestershire

Career statistics
Competition	FC
Matches	51
Runs scored	2307
Batting average	32.49
100s/50s	4/9
Top score	206
Balls bowled	440
Wickets	6
Bowling average	42.00
5 wickets in innings	0
10 wickets in match	0
Best bowling	3/39
Catches/stumpings	22/0
- Source: Cricinfo, 4 August 2013

Denis Neville Moore (26 September 1910 – 2 October 2003) was an English cricketer. He played first-class cricket for Oxford University and Gloucestershire between 1930 and 1936.

Moore had a spectacular debut season as a batsman in 1930, but in 1931 he suffered a hand injury, closely followed by pneumonia and then pleurisy, and never regained his form. He left the first-class game in his mid-twenties to concentrate on his work in the family law firm in Croydon.
