= Alan Ratcliffe =

English cricketer

Personal information
- Full name: Alan Ratcliffe
- Born: 31 January 1909; Dulwich, Surrey, England
- Died: 21 August 1967 (aged 58); Toronto, Ontario, Canada
- Batting: Right-handed

Domestic team information
- Years: Team
- 1937–1939: Buckinghamshire
- 1932–1933: Surrey
- 1931–1939: Marylebone Cricket Club
- 1930–1932: Cambridge University
- 1930–1931: Denbighshire
- 1928–1930: Wales

Career statistics
| Competition | First-class |
|---|---|
| Matches | 49 |
| Runs scored | 1,969 |
| Batting average | 26.25 |
| 100s/50s | 5/9 |
| Top score | 201 |
| Balls bowled | 30 |
| Wickets | – |
| Bowling average | – |
| 5 wickets in innings | – |
| 10 wickets in match | – |
| Best bowling | – |
| Catches/stumpings | 39/– |
- Source: Cricinfo, 13 August 2011

Alan Ratcliffe (31 March 1909 – 21 August 1967) was an English cricketer. Ratcliffe was a right-handed batsman. He was born in Dulwich, Surrey.

His early education was undertaken at Rydal School, Ratcliffe made his first-class debut for Wales against the touring West Indians in 1928 scoring 71, facing the tourists' genuinely quick attack at Llandudno with confidence, hitting a six and 9 fours. He later made 3 further first-class appearances for Wales, the last of which came against the Marylebone Cricket Club in 1930. He scored 227 runs for Wales, which came at an average of 32.42, with a high score of 73.

Ratcliffe undertook his studies at Cambridge University in 1930, it was in that same year that he made his debut for Cambridge University Cricket Club in a first-class match against Yorkshire, the same season in which he made his debut for Denbighshire in the Minor Counties Championship, with him playing 4 further matches for the Welsh county up to 1931. He represented Cambridge University in first-class cricket on another 32 occasions, with his final match for the university coming against Oxford University in 1932. In his 33 first-class appearances, he scored 1,545 runs at an average of 30.29. He made 7 fifties and 5 centuries, with a high score of 201. This score, which was his only career double century, came against Oxford University at Lord's. This innings exceeded the highest score made in a university match by 29 runs, beating the previous high score held by John Marsh. This record though stood for only one day, as the next day the Nawab of Pataudi broke this record by scoring 238 not out for Oxford University. While at Cambridge, he also made the first of first-class appearances for the Marylebone Cricket Club against the Army.

His performances for Cambridge University caught the eyes of Surrey, who signed him. He made his debut for Surrey midway through the 1932 season against Hampshire. He made 6 further first-class appearances for Surrey, the last of which came against Leicestershire in the 1933 County Championship. His time at Surrey was less successful than his endeavours at Cambridge, with him scoring just 142 runs at an average of 17.75, with a high score of 34. He left Surrey at the end of the 1933 season, later joining Buckinghamshire in 1937, making his debut for the county in that seasons Minor Counties Championship against Bedfordshire. He made 11 further appearances for Buckinghamshire, the last of which came against Hertfordshire in 1939. During this period, two further first-class appearances came for the Marylebone Cricket Club, in 1938 against Yorkshire and in Cambridge University in 1939. Following World War II, he made one further first-class appearance, for an Over-33 team against an Under-33 team at Lord's in 1945, although this final appearance came with no success.

Ratcliffe died in Toronto, Ontario, Canada on 21 August 1967.
