= List of Leicestershire County Cricket Club players =

This is a complete list in alphabetical order of cricketers who have played for Leicestershire County Cricket Club in top-class matches since 1894. Founded in 1879, the club held minor status until it was classified as a first-class team in 1894, before joining the County Championship in 1895. Leicestershire has been classified as a List A team since the beginning of limited overs cricket in 1963 and as a top-level Twenty20 team since the inauguration of the Twenty20 Cup in 2003.

The details are the player's usual name followed by the years in which he was active as a Leicestershire player and then his name is given as it would appear on modern match scorecards. Note that many players represented other top-class teams besides Leicestershire and that some played for the club in minor counties cricket before 1894. Current players are shown as active to the latest season in which they played for the club. The list excludes Second XI and other players who did not play for the club's first team; and players whose first team appearances were in minor matches only. The list has been updated to the end of the 2024 cricket season using the data published in Playfair Cricket Annual, 2024 edition and on Cricket Archive.

== A ==
- Varun Aaron (2018) : V. R. Aaron
- Alan Abbott (1946) : A. W. Abbott
- H. D. Ackerman (2004–2009) : H. D. Ackerman
- Colin Ackermann (2017–2023) : C. N. Ackermann
- Alfred Adcock (1938) : R. A. Adcock
- Jonathan Addison (1983–1985) : J. P. Addison
- Stephen Adshead (2000–2010) : S. J. Adshead
- Charles Agar (1898–1900) : C. Agar
- Andrea Agathangelou (2015) : A. P. Agathangelou
- Jonathan Agnew (1978–1992) : J. P. Agnew
- Rehan Ahmed (2021–2024) : Rehan Ahmed
- Aadil Ali (2015–2019) : Aadil Ali or A. M. Ali
- Kadeer Ali (2011–2012) : Kadeer Ali
- Jim Allenby (2005–2009) : J. Allenby
- Thomas Allsopp (1903–1905) : T. C. Allsopp
- Rupesh Amin (2003) : R. M. Amin
- Norman Armstrong (1919–1939) : N. F. Armstrong
- Usman Arshad (2018) : U. Arshad
- Ewart Astill (1906–1939) : W. E. Astill
- Ateeq Javid (2018–2019) : Ateeq Javid
- Hasan Azad (2019–2022) : Hasan Azad

== B ==
- John Bacon (1895) : J. Bacon
- Peter Badham (1933) : P. H. C. Badham
- William Bailey (1891–1903) : W. H. Bailey
- Chris Balderstone (1971–1986) : J. C. Balderstone
- Frank Bale (1920–1928) : F. Bale
- George Ball (1933–1936) : G. A. Ball
- Omari Banks (2001) : O. A. C. Banks
- Herbert Bannister (1912–1921) : H. M. Bannister
- Ed Barnes (2021–2023) : E. Barnes
- Roy Barratt (1961–1970) : R. J. Barratt
- Steve Bartle (1995) : S. Bartle
- Sam Bates (2021) : S. D. Bates
- Walter Beisiegel (1934) : W. K. Beisiegel
- Winston Benjamin (1986–1993) : W. K. M. Benjamin
- James Benning (2009–2010) : J. G. E. Benning
- William Benskin (1906–1924) : W. E. Benskin
- Justin Benson (1988–1993) : J. D. R. Benson
- William Berridge (1923–1924) : W. Berridge
- W. C. M. Berridge (1914–1922) : W. C. M. Berridge
- Les Berry (1924–1951) : G. L. Berry
- Michael Bevan (2002) : M. G. Bevan
- David Billington (1985) : D. J. Billington
- Dickie Bird (1960–1964) : H. D. Bird
- Jack Birkenshaw (1961–1980) : J. Birkenshaw
- Mark Blackett (1985–1986) : M. Blackett
- Cecil Boden (1911–1913) : C. A. Boden
- Tim Boon (1980–1995) : T. J. Boon
- Brian Booth (1964–1973) : B. J. Booth
- Peter Booth (1972–1981) : P. Booth
- Brian Boshier (1953–1964) : B. S. Boshier
- Scott Boswell (1998–2001) : S. A. J. Boswell
- Peter Bowler (1986–1987) : P. D. Bowler
- Frederick Bowley (1930–1931) : F. J. Bowley
- Herrick Bowley (1933–1937) : H. B. Bowley
- Nathan Bowley (2022) : N. J. Bowley
- Matthew Boyce (2006–2015) : M. A. G. Boyce
- J. C. Bradshaw (1923–1933) : J. C. Bradshaw
- J. W. M. Bradshaw (1935–1938) : J. W. M. Bradshaw
- Stanley Bradshaw (1923) : S. W. Bradshaw
- Walter Bradshaw (1929) : W. H. Bradshaw
- Damian Brandy (2002–2004) : D. G. Brandy
- Norman Briers (1967) : N. Briers
- Nigel Briers (1971–1995) : N. E. Briers
- David Brignull (2002–2005) : D. S. Brignull
- Matthew Brimson (1993–1999) : M. T. Brimson
- Stuart Broad (2005–2007) : S. C. J. Broad
- Alf Broughton (1928–1933) : E. A. Broughton
- Peter Broughton (1960–1962) : P. N. Broughton
- Cecil Brown (1920–1921) : C. L. M. Brown
- Joseph Brown (1898–1905) : J. H. Brown
- Lewis Brown (1896–1903) : L. Brown
- William Brown (1910–1919) : W. Brown
- Nathan Buck (2009–2014) : N. L. Buck
- Sol Budinger (2022–2024) : S. G. Budinger
- Geoffrey Burch (1958–1964) : G. W. Burch
- John Burdett (1919) : J. W. Burdett
- Henry Burgess (1900–1902) : H. Burgess
- John Burgess (1902–1913) : J. Burgess
- Michael Burgess (2015–2016) : M. G. K. Burgess
- James Burke (2017) : J. E. Burke
- Joe Burns (2013) : J. A. Burns
- Neil Burns (2000–2002) : N. D. Burns
- Donald Butchart (2018) : D. N. Butchart
- Ian Butcher (1979–1987) : I. P. Butcher

== C ==
- Michael Carberry (2017–2018) : M. A. Carberry
- Ian Carmichael (1984) : I. R. Carmichael
- John Carter (1959) : J. W. Carter
- Edward Challenor (1906–1913) : E. L. Challenor
- Mat Chapman (1894–1895) : M. Chapman
- Thomas Chapman (1946–1950) : T. A. Chapman
- Zak Chappell (2015–2018) : Z. J. Chappell
- Peter Cherrington (1938) : P. R. Cherrington
- Steven Clark (2006) : S. G. Clark
- A. Clarke (1902) : A. Clarke (Note: Clarke was a right-arm fast bowler who played a single match for Leicestershire, taking two wickets in a County Championship fixture against Essex in 1902. Other than a surname and initial, no biographical details are known.)
- Basil Clarke (1922) : B. F. Clarke
- Vince Clarke (1995–1996) : V. P. Clarke
- Mark Cleary (2004) : M. F. Cleary
- Sam Cliff (2007–2011) : S. J. Cliff
- Paddy Clift (1975–1987) : P. B. Clift
- Josh Cobb (2007–2014) : J. J. Cobb
- Russell Cobb (1980–1997) : R. A. Cobb
- Arthur Cobley (1897–1904) : A. Cobley
- Geoffrey Coe (1963) : G. Coe
- Samuel Coe (1896–1923) : S. Coe
- Alfred Coleman (1926–1935) : C. A. R. Coleman
- David Constant (1965–1968) : D. J. Constant
- Nick Cook (1978–1985) : N. G. B. Cook
- Walter Cornock (1948) : W. B. Cornock
- Percy Corrall (1930–1951) : P. Corrall
- Mark Cosgrove (2015–2019) : M. J. Cosgrove
- John Cotton (1965–1969) : J. Cotton
- Sydney Coulson (1923–1927) : S. S. Coulson
- Ben Cox (2023–2024) : O. B. Cox
- Reginald Crawford (1901–1911) : R. T. Crawford
- Vivian Crawford (1903–1910) : V. F. S. Crawford
- Bernard Cromack (1959–1968) : B. Cromack
- Hansie Cronje (1995) : W. J. Cronje
- Graham Cross (1960–1977) : G. F. Cross
- Carl Crowe (1995–2009) : C. D. Crowe
- Ryan Cummins (2005–2008) : R. A. G. Cummins
- Robert Cunliffe (2002–2003) : R. J. Cunliffe
- Scott Currie (2023–2024) : S. W. Currie
- John Curtis (1906–1921) : J. S. Curtis
- William Curtis (1911–1920) : W. F. Curtis

== D ==
- Lee Daggett (2008) : L. M. Daggett
- Charles Dagnall (2002–2009) : C. E. Dagnall
- Jonathan Dakin (1993–2004) : J. M. Dakin
- Josh Davey (2023) : J. H. Davey
- Arthur Davis (1901–1908) : A. E. Davis
- Richard Davis (2001) : R. P. Davis
- Will Davis (2019–2023) : W. S. Davis
- Brian Davison (1970–1983) : B. F. Davison
- George Dawkes (1937–1939) : G. O. Dawkes
- Eddie Dawson (1922–1934) : E. W. Dawson
- John De Lisle (1921–1930) : J. A. F. M. P. de Lisle
- Charles de Trafford (1888–1920) : C. E. de Trafford
- Harry Dearden (2016–2021) : H. E. Dearden
- Phillip DeFreitas (1985–2005) : P. A. J. DeFreitas
- Gareth Delany (2020) : G. J. Delany
- Cameron Delport (2017–2018) : C. S. Delport
- Stewie Dempster (1935–1941) : C. S. Dempster
- Neil Dexter (2016–2019) : N. J. Dexter
- Ted Dickinson (1933–1935) : J. E. Dickinson
- Jamie Dickinson (2018) : J. W. Dickinson
- Tony Diment (1955–1958) : R. A. Diment
- Boeta Dippenaar (2008–2009) : H. H. Dippenaar
- Paul Dixey (2011–2012) : P. G. Dixey
- Alexander Dixon (1900) : A. W. Dixon
- Ivan D'Oliveira (1967) : I. D'Oliveira
- Neville Dowen (1925–1938) : N. T. Dowen
- Cyril Drake (1939) : C. H. Drake
- Vasbert Drakes (2003) : V. C. Drakes
- Dillon du Preez (2008) : D. du Preez
- Jacques du Toit (2008–2012) : J. du Toit
- Barry Dudleston (1966–1980) : B. Dudleston
- Norman Dunham (1949) : N. L. Dunham

== E ==
- Ned Eckersley (2011–2018) : E. J. H. Eckersley
- Charles Edgson (1933–1939) : C. L. Edgson
- Richard Edmunds (1989) : R. H. Edmunds
- Arthur Emmett (1902) : A. Emmett
- Bill Etherington (1948) : M. W. Etherington
- Alex Evans (2019–2021) : H. A. Evans
- Gwynn Evans (1949) : G. Evans
- Michael Evans (1946) : M. Evans
- Sam Evans (2017–2024) : S. T. Evans
- William Lindsay Everard (1924) : W. L. Everard
- Joey Evison (2022) : J. D. M. Evison

== F ==
- Will Fazackerley (2017) : W. N. Fazackerley
- Nicholas Ferraby (2007) : N. J. Ferraby
- George Ferris (1983–1990) : G. J. F. Ferris
- Michael Finan (2022–2023) : M. G. A. Finan
- William Finney (1890–1894) : W. Finney
- Jack Firth (1951–1958) : J. Firth
- William Flamson (1934–1939) : W. H. Flamson
- Grant Flower (2002) : G. W. Flower
- Grant Forster (1980–1982) : G. Forster
- Fred Foulds (1952–1956) : F. G. Foulds
- Brenden Fourie (1994) : B. C. Fourie
- Gustavus Fowke (1899–1927) : G. H. S. Fowke
- Ollie Freckingham (2013–2015) : O. H. Freckingham
- Joseph Frisby (1938) : J. B. Frisby
- Harry Funnell (2018) : J. H. Funnell

== G ==
- Robin Gardner (1954–1962) : L. R. Gardner
- Mike Garnham (1980–1988) : M. A. Garnham
- George Geary (1912–1938) : G. Geary
- Frederic Geeson (1895–1902) : F. Geeson
- Arthur German (1923–1924) : A. C. J. German
- Harry German (1896–1898) : H. German
- Fred Gibson (1946) : A. L. Gibson
- Ottis Gibson (2004–2005) : O. D. Gibson
- Martyn Gidley (1989–1992) : M. I. Gidley
- Ernest Gill (1901–1903) : E. H. Gill
- George Gill (1903–1906) : G. C. Gill
- Paul Gill (1986–1987) : P. Gill
- Christopher Gimson (1921) : C. Gimson
- Joseph Glennon (1921) : J. E. Glennon
- Robert Gofton (1992) : R. P. Gofton
- Lewis Goldsworthy (2024) : L. P. Goldsworthy
- Don Goodson (1950–1953) : D. Goodson
- Jeff Goodwin (1950–1959) : T. J. Goodwin
- David Gower (1975–1989) : D. I. Gower
- Henry Graham (1936–1937) : H. C. Graham
- Frank Gray (1895) : F. D. Gray
- Alex Green (2024) : A. M. Green
- Ben Green (2024) : B. G. F. Green
- Stephen Greensword (1963–1966) : S. Greensword
- George Grewcock (1899) : G. Grewcock
- Adam Griffith (2006) : A. R. Griffith
- Gavin Griffiths (2017–2021) : G. T. Griffiths
- Paul Griffiths (2000–2001) : P. Griffiths
- Jamie Grove (2002–2003) : J. O. Grove
- Harry Gurney (2006–2012) : H. F. Gurney

== H ==
- Aftab Habib (1995–2006) : A. Habib
- Lloyd Hales (1947) : L. A. Hales
- Maurice Hallam (1950–1970) : M. R. Hallam
- John Hampshire (1980) : J. H. Hampshire
- Arthur Hampson (1905–1906) : A. H. Hampson
- Peter Handscomb (2023–2024) : P. S. P. Handscomb
- Arun Harinath (2017) : A. Harinath
- Andrew Harris (2009–2010) : A. J. Harris
- Gordon Harris (1986) : G. A. R. Harris
- Marcus Harris (2021–2024) : M. S. Harris
- Paul Harrison (2005–2007) : P. W. Harrison
- Dawson Harron (1951) : D. G. Harron
- Douglas Harrop (1972) : D. J. Harrop
- Frederick Hassall (1892–1894) : F. H. Hassall
- Christopher Hawkes (1990–1992) : C. J. Hawkes
- Ernie Hayes (1926) : E. G. Hayes
- Michael Haysman (1984) : M. D. Haysman
- John Haywood (1900–1903) : J. W. Haywood
- Paul Haywood (1969–1977) : P. R. Haywood
- Arthur Hazlerigg, 1st Baron Hazlerigg (1907–1910) : A. G. Hazlerigg
- Arthur Hazlerigg, 2nd Baron Hazlerigg (1930–1934) : A. G. Hazlerigg
- Claude Henderson (2004–2013) : C. W. Henderson
- Beuran Hendricks (2022) : B. E. Hendricks
- Peter Hepworth (1988–1994) : P. N. Hepworth
- Geoffrey Hickinbottom (1959) : G. A. Hickinbottom
- Frank Hickley (1921) : F. Hickley
- Malcolm Hickman (1954–1957) : M. F. Hickman
- Ken Higgs (1972–1986) : K. Higgs
- Lewis Hill (2015–2024) : L. J. Hill
- George Hillyard (1894–1896) : G. W. Hillyard
- Richard Hincks (1895) : R. Hincks
- John Hings (1934) : J. P. Hings
- Brad Hodge (2003–2010) : B. J. Hodge
- Matthew Hoggard (2010–2013) : M. J. Hoggard
- Ian Holland (2024) : I. G. Holland
- John Holland (1894–1896) : J. Holland
- Kenneth Holland (1935) : K. Holland
- Paul Horton (2016–2019) : P. J. Horton
- Arthur Howard (1921) : A. Howard
- Jack Howard (1946–1948) : J. Howard
- Frederick Hudson (1901) : F. J. Hudson
- Josh Hull (2023–2024) : J. O. Hull
- David Humphries (1974–1976) : D. J. Humphries
- William Hurd (1932–1934) : W. S. Hurd
- Leonard Hutchinson (1923–1925) : L. S. Hutchinson

== I ==
- Ray Illingworth (1969–1978) : R. Illingworth
- Josh Inglis (2021) : J. P. Inglis
- Clive Inman (1961–1971) : C. C. Inman
- Anthony Ireland (2013–2014) : A. J. Ireland

== J ==
- Vic Jackson (1938–1956) : V. E. Jackson
- Arno Jacobs (2007) : A. Jacobs
- Peter Jaques (1949) : P. H. Jaques
- James Jarvis (1900) : J. E. F. Jarvis
- Stanley Jayasinghe (1961–1965) : S. Jayasinghe
- Thomas Jayes (1903–1911) : T. Jayes
- Will Jefferson (2010–2012) : W. I. Jefferson
- Howard Jeffery (1964) : H. W. J. Jeffery
- Wilfrid Jelf (1911) : W. W. Jelf
- Neil Johnson (1997) : N. C. Johnson
- Richard Jones (2014–2018) : R. A. Jones
- William Jones (2010–2012) : W. S. Jones
- Robbie Joseph (2011–2012) : R. H. Joseph
- John Josephs (1946–1953) : J. M. Josephs
- Francis Joyce (1911–1920) : F. M. Joyce
- John Joyce (1890–1894) : J. H. Joyce
- Ralph Joyce (1896–1907) : R. Joyce
- Ray Julian (1953–1971) : R. Julian

== K ==
- Mohammad Kaif (2002) : M. Kaif
- Michael Kasprowicz (1999) : M. S. Kasprowicz
- Aamer Khan (1998–2000) : Aamer Khan
- Louis Kimber (2021–2024) : L. P. J. Kimber
- Teddy King (1925) : E. King
- Harry King (1912–1920) : H. King
- John King (1895–1925) : J. H. King
- James King (1899–1905) : J. King
- John William King (1929) : J. W. King
- David Kirby (1959–1964) : D. Kirby
- Dieter Klein (2016–2021) : D. Klein
- George Knew junior (1972–1973) : G. A. Knew
- George Knew senior (1939) : G. F. Knew
- Albert Knight (1895–1912) : A. E. Knight
- Barry Knight (1967–1969) : B. R. Knight
- Peter Konig (1949) : P. H. Konig
- Jason Krejza (2005) : J. J. Krejza
- Garnett Kruger (2007–2008) : G. J. P. Kruger
- Anil Kumble (2000) : A. Kumble

== L ==
- Charl Langeveldt (2007) : C. K. Langeveldt
- Jermaine Lawson (2008) : J. J. C. Lawson
- Jack Lee (1947) : J. Lee
- Nevill Lee (1922–1924) : N. B. Lee
- Gerry Lester (1936–1958) : G. Lester
- Chris Lewis (1987–2000) : C. C. Lewis
- Chris Liddle (2004–2006) : C. J. Liddle
- Arron Lilley (2019–2023) : A. M. Lilley
- Tony Lock (1965–1967) : G. A. R. Lock
- Hugh Logan (1903) : H. Logan
- Albert Lord (1910–1926) : A. Lord
- Alexander Lorrimer (1890–1896) : A. Lorrimer
- David Lorrimer (1890–1895) : D. Lorrimer

== M ==
- Robert MacDonald (1899–1902) : R. MacDonald
- Greg Macmillan (1994–1997) : G. I. Macmillan
- Darren Maddy (1993–2006) : D. L. Maddy
- John Maguire (1991) : J. N. Maguire
- Devon Malcolm (2001–2003) : D. E. Malcolm
- Johan Malcolm (2008) : R. J. A. Malcolm
- Nadeem Malik (2008–2012) : M. N. Malik
- Mansoor Amjad (2006–2007) : Mansoor Amjad
- Thomas Marlow (1900–1903) : T. Marlow
- William Marlow (1931–1936) : W. H. Marlow
- Peter Marner (1965–1970) : P. T. Marner
- Harold Marriott (1894–1902) : H. H. Marriott
- Daniel Marsh (2001) : D. J. Marsh
- Damien Martyn (1991) : D. R. Martyn
- Tim Mason (1994–1999) : T. J. Mason
- Daniel Masters (2009–2010): D. Masters
- David Masters (2003–2007) : D. D. Masters
- Albert Matthews (1965–1968) : A. J. Matthews
- Robin Matthews (1971–1973) : R. B. Matthews
- Alfred Matts (1921) : A. S. Matts
- John Maunders (2003–2007) : J. K. Maunders
- Andrew McDonald (2010–2012) : A. B. McDonald
- Clint McKay (2015–2017) : C. J. McKay
- Garth McKenzie (1969–1975) : G. D. McKenzie
- Norman McVicker (1974–1977) : N. M. McVicker
- John Middleton (1914–1921) : J. W. Middleton
- Ben Mike (2018–2024) : B. W. M. Mike
- David Millns (1990–1999) : D. J. Millns
- Frederick Mills (1921–1923) : F. Mills
- John Mitten (1961–1963) : J. Mitten
- Mohammad Abbas (2018–2019) : Mohammad Abbas
- Mohammad Asif (2006) : Mohammad Asif
- Mohammad Nabi (2018) : Mohammad Nabi
- Preston Mommsen (2012) : P. L. Mommsen
- Dinesh Mongia (2005–2006) : D. Mongia
- Arthur Mounteney (1911–1924) : A. Mounteney
- Harold Mudge (1937) : H. Mudge
- Wiaan Mulder (2022–2024) : P. W. A. Mulder
- Alan Mullally (1990–1999) : A. D. Mullally
- Donald Munden (1960–1961) : D. F. X. Munden
- Paul Munden (1957–1964) : P. A. Munden
- Victor Munden (1946–1957) : V. S. Munden
- George Munsey (2019) : H. G. Munsey

== N ==
- Jigar Naik (2006–2016) : J. K. H. Naik
- Naseem Shah (2023) : Naseem Shah
- Naveen-ul-Haq (2021–2023) : Naveen-ul-Haq
- Rowland Needham (1911) : R. Needham
- James Neesham (2024) : J. D. S. Neesham
- Tom New (2003–2011) : T. J. New
- Alfred Newcomb (1911) : A. E. Newcomb
- Paul Nixon (1989–2012) : P. A. Nixon
- Mick Norman (1966–1975) : M. E. J. C. Norman

== O ==
- Iain O'Brien (2009) : I. E. O'Brien
- Niall O'Brien (2013–2016) : N. J. O'Brien
- Edwin Odell (1912) : E. F. Odell
- William Odell (1901–1914) : W. W. Odell
- James Ormond (1995–2001) : J. Ormond
- Frederick Osborn (1911–1913) : F. Osborn
- Donald Oscroft (1928) : D. S. Oscroft

== P ==
- Charles Packe (1929–1934) : C. W. C. Packe
- Michael Packe (1936–1939) : M. S. Packe
- Robert Packe (1933) : R. J. Packe
- Charles Palmer (1950–1959) : C. H. Palmer
- George Palmer (1938–1939) : G. H. Palmer
- John Palmer (1906) : J. Palmer
- William Parkins (1950) : W. R. Parkins
- Callum Parkinson (2017–2023) : C. F. Parkinson
- Ernest Parkinson (1920) : E. W. Parkinson
- Gordon Parsons (1978–1997) : G. J. Parsons
- Rishi Patel (2020–2024) : R. K. Patel
- Albert Payne (1906–1907) : A. Payne
- Kenneth Peake (1946) : K. G. Peake
- John Pember (1968–1971) : J. D. D. Pember
- Mark Pettini (2016–2017) : M. L. Pettini
- Edmund Phillips (1957–1959) : E. F. Phillips
- Harry Pickering (1947) : H. G. Pickering
- Adrian Pierson (1993–1997) : A. R. K. Pierson
- Mathew Pillans (2017) : M. W. Pillans
- Neil Pinner (2015) : N. D. Pinner
- Joel Pope (2008–2010) : J. I. Pope
- Laurie Potter (1986–1993) : L. Potter
- Dick Pougher (1885–1901) : A. D. Pougher
- John Powers (1890–1896) : J. Powers
- Rodney Pratt (1955–1964) : R. L. Pratt
- William Pratt (1920–1930) : W. E. Pratt
- Francis Prentice (1934–1951) : F. T. Prentice

== R ==
- Luke Radford (2011) : L. A. Radford
- Ben Raine (2013–2018) : B. A. Raine
- Uttam Ramji (2023) : U. Ramji (Note: Uttam Ramji, who was born in India in 2004, played in two List A matches for the team during the 2023 season. He was educated at Soar Valley College and Loughborough College and had previously played age-group and Second XI cricket for the county.)
- Frederick Randon junior (1894) : F. J. Randon
- Ajinkya Rahane (2024) : A. M. Rahane
- Kenneth Raynor (1923) : K. Raynor
- Abdul Razzaq (2011–2012) : Abdul Razzaq
- Dan Redfern (2014–2015) : D. J. Redfern
- Carlos Remy (1996) : C. C. Remy
- Alan Revill (1958–1960) : A. C. Revill
- George Rhodes (2019–2022) : G. H. Rhodes
- Riaz-ur-Rehman (1966) : Riaz-ur-Rehman
- Alan Rice (1954) : A. S. Rice
- Anthony Riddington (1931–1950) : A. Riddington
- Edwin Riley (1892–1895) : E. Riley
- Harold Riley (1928–1937) : H. Riley
- William Riley (1911–1914) : W. N. Riley
- Andy Roberts (1981–1984) : A. M. E. Roberts
- Alex Roberts (cricketer) (2009) : A. Roberts
- Darren Robinson (2004–2007) : D. D. J. Robinson
- Phil Robinson (1992–1999) : P. E. Robinson
- Angus Robson (2013–2016) : A. J. Robson
- Chris Rogers (2005) : C. J. L. Rogers
- Michael Rose (1963–1964) : M. H. Rose
- Andrew Roseberry (1992) : A. Roseberry
- Marc Rosenberg (2006–2007) : M. C. Rosenberg
- Daniel Rowe (2006–2008) : D. T. Rowe (Note: Rowe played in nine first-class, seven List A and two Twenty20 matches for the team between 2006 and 2008. He also appeared in Minor Counties for Oxfordshire.)
- George Rudd junior (1913–1932) : G. B. F. Rudd
- George Rudd senior (1893–1901) : G. E. Rudd
- Hamish Rutherford (2022) : H. D. Rutherford

== S ==
- Atul Sachdeva (1999) : A. Sachdeva
- John Sadler (2003–2007) : J. L. Sadler
- Abidine Sakande (2021) : A. Sakande
- Matt Salisbury (2023–2024) : M. E. T. Salisbury
- Gordon Salmon (1913–1924) : G. H. Salmon
- Murray Sargent (1951–1952) : M. A. J. Sargent
- Ramnaresh Sarwan (2012–2014) : R. R. Sarwan
- Philip Saunders (1951–1952) : P. F. Saunders
- John Savage (1953–1966) : J. S. Savage
- David Sayer (2018) : D. W. Sayer
- Rob Sayer (2015–2017) : R. J. Sayer
- Martin Schepens (1973–1980) : M. Schepens
- Tom Scriven (2022–2024) : T. A. R. Scriven
- Virender Sehwag (2003) : V. Sehwag
- Shahid Afridi (2001) : Shahid Afridi
- Ajmal Shahzad (2017) : A. Shahzad
- Aubrey Sharp (1908–1935) : A. T. Sharp
- John Sharp (1937–1946) : J. A. T. Sharp
- Atif Sheikh (2014–2016) : A. Sheikh
- Alamgir Sheriyar (1993–2006) : A. Sheriyar
- Patrick Sherrard (1938) : P. Sherrard
- John Shields (1906–1923) : J. Shields
- George Shingler (1920–1921) : G. Shingler
- Alan Shipman (1920–1936) : A. W. Shipman
- Bill Shipman (1908–1921) : W. Shipman
- Charlie Shreck (2014–2017) : C. E. Shreck
- Ken Shuttleworth (1977–1980) : K. Shuttleworth
- Tom Sidwell (1913–1933) : T. E. Sidwell
- Phil Simmons (1994–1998) : P. V. Simmons
- R. P. Singh (2007) : R. P. Singh
- Alec Skelding (1912–1929) : A. Skelding
- Ben Slater (2020) : B. T. Slater
- Arthur Smith (1897–1901) : A. Smith
- Ben Smith (1990–2001) : B. F. Smith
- Greg Smith (2008–2015) : G. P. Smith
- Graham Smith (1949) : G. S. Smith
- Haydon Smith (1925–1939) : H. A. Smith
- John Smith (1921) : J. W. D. Smith
- John Smith (1950–1955) : J. W. R. Smith
- Kenneth Smith (1950–1951) : K. D. Smith
- M. J. K. Smith (1951–1955) : M. J. K. Smith
- Peter Smith (1956–1957) : P. T. Smith
- Raymond Smith (1956–1964) : R. C. Smith
- Tom Smith (2008) : T. C. Smith
- Walter Smith (1930–1946) : W. A. Smith
- Gerald Smithson (1951–1956) : G. A. Smithson
- Jeremy Snape (2003–2008) : J. N. Snape
- Horace Snary (1921–1933) : H. C. Snary
- Lawrence Spence (1952–1954) : L. A. Spence
- Terry Spencer (1952–1977) : C. T. Spencer
- James Sperry (1937–1952) : J. Sperry
- Javagal Srinath (2002) : J. Srinath
- Ian Stanger (1994) : I. M. Stanger
- Clement Starmer (1925) : C. E. Starmer
- Scott Steel (2021–2022) : S. Steel
- David Steele (1980) : D. S. Steele
- John Steele (1970–1983) : J. F. Steele
- Billy Stelling (2000–2001) : W. F. Stelling
- Richard Stemp (2002) : R. D. Stemp
- Darren Stevens (1996–2004) : D. I. Stevens
- Paul Stirling (2024) : P. R. Stirling
- Francis Stocks (1892–1903) : F. W. Stocks
- Charles Stone (1884–1896) : C. C. Stone
- Terry Stretton (1972–1975) : T. K. Stretton
- Peter Stringer (1970–1972) : P. M. Stringer
- Walter Sturman (1909–1912) : W. Sturman
- Peter Such (1987–1989) : P. M. Such
- Iain Sutcliffe (1995–2002) : I. J. Sutcliffe
- Harry Swindells (2018–2024) : H. J. Swindells
- James Sykes (2011–2016) : J. S. Sykes
- Stuart Symington (1948–1949) : S. J. Symington

== T ==
- Claude Taylor (1922–1927) : C. H. Taylor
- James Taylor, born 1917 (1937) : J. A. S. Taylor
- Jerome Taylor (2007) : J. E. Taylor
- James Taylor, born 1990 (2008–2012) : J. W. A. Taylor
- Les Taylor (1977–1990) : L. B. Taylor
- Robert Taylor (2011–2016) : R. M. L. Taylor
- Tom Taylor (2018–2020) : T. A. I. Taylor
- Lloyd Tennant (1986–1991) : L. Tennant
- Shiv Thakor (2011–2013) : S. J. Thakor
- Arthur Thompson (1937) : A. P. Thompson
- Chris Thompson (2009) : C. E. J. Thompson
- Herbert Thompson (1908–1910) : H. Thompson
- Thomas Thompson (1963–1964) : T. Thompson
- Michael Thornely (2012–2014) : M. A. Thornely
- John Thornton (1921) : J. A. C. Thornton
- Laurence Thursting (1938–1947) : L. D. Thursting
- Eric Tilley (1946) : E. W. Tilley
- Jeffrey Tolchard (1970–1977) : J. G. Tolchard
- Roger Tolchard (1965–1983) : R. W. Tolchard
- William Tomlin (1887–1899) : W. Tomlin
- Maurice Tompkin (1938–1956) : M. Tompkin
- Joseph Toon (1902–1909) : J. Toon
- Liam Trevaskis (2024) : L. Trevaskis
- Mike Turner (1954–1959) : F. M. Turner
- Bob Turner (1909–1911) : R. F. Turner
- Bernard Tyler (1926–1928) : B. Tyler

== U ==
- Geoffrey Udal (1946) : G. F. U. Udal
- Umar Amin (2023) : Umar Amin

== V ==
- Jack van Geloven (1956–1965) : J. van Geloven

== W ==
- Edwin Walker (1930) : E. W. Walker
- George Walker (2002–2009) : G. W. Walker
- Nick Walker (2006–2007) : N. G. E. Walker
- Roman Walker (2022–2024) : R. I. Walker
- Jack Walsh (1937–1956) : J. E. Walsh
- George Walton (1889–1895) : G. Walton
- Alan Ward (1977–1978) : A. Ward
- Trevor Ward (2000–2003) : T. R. Ward
- Thomas Warren (1882–1895) : T. H. Warren
- George Watson (1934–1950) : G. S. Watson
- Willie Watson (1958–1964) : W. Watson
- Charles Watts (1924) : C. G. Watts
- Geoffrey Webb (1933–1938) : A. G. G. Webb
- James Weighell (2020) : W. J. Weighell
- Nick Welch (2020–2023) : N. R. Welch
- Tom Wells (2012–2018) : T. J. Wells
- Vince Wells (1992–2002) : V. J. Wells
- David Wenlock (1980–1982) : D. A. Wenlock
- Richard West (1939) : A. R. West
- Alan Weston (1933–1934) : A. G. Weston
- Alan Wharton (1961–1963) : A. Wharton
- Matthew Whiley (2001–2003) : M. J. A. Whiley
- James Whitaker (1983–1999) : J. J. Whitaker
- Wayne White (2009–2016) : W. A. White
- Harry Whitehead (1898–1922) : H. Whitehead
- John Whiteside (1893–1906) : J. P. Whiteside
- Phil Whitticase (1984–1997) : P. Whitticase
- Searson Wigginton (1930–1934) : S. H. Wigginton
- Craig Wilkinson (1991) : C. W. Wilkinson
- Peter Willey (1984–1991) : P. Willey
- Edward Williams (1949) : E. L. Williams
- Robbie Williams (2013) : R. E. M. Williams
- Dominic Williamson (1996–2000) : D. Williamson
- Charl Willoughby (2005) : C. M. Willoughby
- Cecil Wood (1896–1923) : C. J. B. Wood
- Edwin Wood (1907) : E. J. Wood
- Sam Wood (2024) : S. B. Wood
- Arthur Woodcock (1889–1908) : A. Woodcock
- Charles Wooler (1949–1951) : C. R. D. Wooler
- Ashley Wright (2000–2002) : A. S. Wright
- Chris Wright (2019–2024) : C. J. C. Wright
- Frederick Wright (1887–1897) : F. Wright
- Harold Wright (1912–1914) : H. Wright
- Luke Wright (2003) : L. J. Wright
- Samuel Wright (1886–1897) : S. R. Wright
- Alex Wyatt (2009–2014) : A. C. F. Wyatt
- Geoffrey Wykes (1923) : G. N. Wykes

== See also ==
- List of Leicestershire cricket captains
