= List of Leicestershire cricket captains =

Leicestershire County Cricket Club was officially founded on 25 March 1879. Leicestershire's team was elevated to first-class status in 1894 and the club joined the County Championship in 1895. It is one of eighteen county teams in England and Wales that play first-class cricket. The player appointed club captain leads the team in all fixtures except if unavailable.

- Charles de Trafford (1894–1906)
- Arthur Hazlerigg senior (1907–1910)
- John Shields (1911–1913)
- Cecil Wood (1914, 1919–1920)
- Aubrey Sharp (1921)
- Gustavus Fowke (1922–1927)
- Eddie Dawson (1928–1929, 1931, 1933)
- John de Lisle (1930)
- Charles Packe (1932)
- Arthur Hazlerigg junior (1934)
- Ewart Astill (1935)
- Stewie Dempster (1936–1938)
- Michael Packe (1939)
- Les Berry (1946–1948)
- Stuart Symington (1949)
- Charles Palmer (1950–1957)
- Willie Watson (1958–1961)
- David Kirby (1962)
- Maurice Hallam (1963–1965, 1968)
- Tony Lock (1966–1967)
- Ray Illingworth (1969–1978)
- Ken Higgs (1979)
- Brian Davison (1980)
- Roger Tolchard (1981–1983)
- David Gower (1984–1986, 1988–1989)
- Peter Willey (1987)
- Nigel Briers (1990–1995)
- James Whitaker (1996–1999)
- Vince Wells (1999–2002)
- Phillip DeFreitas (2003–2004)
- Hylton Ackerman (2005)
- Jeremy Snape (2006–2007)
- Paul Nixon (2007–2010)
- Matthew Hoggard (2010–2012)
- Ramnaresh Sarwan (2013–2014)
- Mark Cosgrove (2015–2017)
- Michael Carberry (2018)
- Paul Horton (2018–2019)
- Colin Ackermann (2020-2022)
- Callum Parkinson (2022)
- Lewis Hill (2023 to date)

== See also ==
- List of Leicestershire CCC players
