= George Rudd =

George Rudd may refer to:

- George Rudd (cricketer, born 1866) (1866–1921)
- George Rudd (cricketer, born 1894) (1894–1957)
- George Thomas Rudd (c. 1795–1847), English entomologist
