= Matthew Chapman =

Matt Chapman (born 1993) is an American professional baseball player

Matthew Chapman or Matt Chapman may refer to:

- Matthew Chapman (author) (born 1950), author, screenwriter, director, journalist and great-great-grandson of Charles Darwin
- Matthew Chapman (born 1976), one half of The Brothers Chaps who created the Homestar Runner animated cartoons
- Matt Chapman, editor of MyM magazine
- Matt Chapman, British horse racing journalist and presenter on ITV Racing
- Mat Chapman (1865–1909), English cricketer
