= Edwin Wood =

Edwin Wood may refer to:

- Edwin Wood (cricketer) (1868–?), English cricketer
- Edwin Orin Wood (1861–1918), American politician in Michigan
- Eddie Wood (1879–1926), American football player
- Carl Wood (Edwin Carlyle Wood, 1929–2011), Australian gynaecologist
