= Peter Hans Konig =

Austrian-born English cricketer (born 1931)

Peter Konig
- Born: Peter Hans König; 16 October 1931 (age 95); Vienna, Lower Austria, Austria

Rugby union career
- Position: Back row
Senior career
Years	Team	Apps	(Points)
1952–1960	Leicester Tigers	185	(96)
- Cricket career

Cricket information
- Batting: Right-handed
- Role: Wicket-keeper

Domestic team information
- Years: Team
- 1949: Leicestershire

Career statistics
Competition	First-class
Matches	1
Runs scored	6
Batting average	6.00
100s/50s	0/0
Top score	6
Catches/stumpings	1/1
- Source: Cricinfo, 30 December 2012

Peter Hans Konig, more correctly König, (born 16 October 1931) is an Austrian-born retired sportsman. Konig was a prominent rugby union player for Leicester Tigers between 1952 and 1960 and played one first class game for Leicestershire County Cricket Club in 1949. Konig was a right-handed batsman who played as a wicket-keeper.

== Early life and cricket ==
Born in Vienna to Jewish parents, his family fled Austria following its annexation by Nazi Germany in 1938, arriving in Leicester before the Second World War. Konig later made a single first-class appearance for Leicestershire against Northamptonshire at the County Ground, Northampton in 1949. In Northamptonshire's first-innings of 239 all out, Konig made a single stumping when he stumped Gordon Garlick off the bowling of Gerry Lester. In Leicestershire's first-innings response, Konig was the last man out, dismissed for 6 runs by Des Barrick. In Northamptonshire's second-innings of 350/5 declared, Konig caught Percy Davis off the bowling of Charles Wooler. This was his only major appearance for the county as Konig was not kept on by Leicestershire.

== Rugby ==
Konig made his Leicester Tigers debut on 14 April 1952 in a 19–0 win away to Plymouth Albion on the club's Easter tour. Konig established himself in the club's first team the next season immediately starting the first 11 games of the 1952–53 season and 27 overall. Konig was particularly prominent in Leicester's 8–3 win away to Bath on 3 January 1953, scoring one try and creating another through a crucial interception and break. In 1953-54 Konig was the club's joint top try scorer with 8 in 23 games, and in 1956 he started as Leicester played Romania at Welford Road. His try-scoring form in a December 1956 win against Blackheath saw the Daily Mirror speculate he could be called up by England, but he was never selected for the national side and made his final Tigers appearance in April 1960.
