= William Marlowe (disambiguation) =

William Marlowe was an actor.

William Marlow or Marlowe may also refer to:

- William Marlow
- William Marlow (cricketer)
- William Marlowe (MP) for City of London (Parliament of England constituency)
- William Biddlecomb Marlow
