= Paul Griffiths =

Paul Griffiths may refer to:

- Paul J. Griffiths (born 1955), Catholic theologian
- Paul Griffiths (director) (born 1973), Welsh writer, theatre critic and director
- Paul Griffiths (writer) (born 1947), British music critic, novelist and librettist
- Paul Griffiths (cricketer, born 1975), English cricketer
- Paul Griffiths (cricketer, born 1979), English cricketer
- Paul Griffiths (businessman) (born 1957), British businessman
- Paul E. Griffiths (born 1962), Australian philosopher
- Paul Griffiths (British Army officer)
- Paul Griffiths (diplomat), ambassador of Australia to Israel since 2020
