= Gerry Lester =

English cricketer (1915–1998)

Personal information
- Full name: Gerald Lester
- Born: 27 December 1915; Long Whatton, Leicestershire, England
- Died: 26 January 1998 (aged 82); Leicester, Leicestershire
- Batting: Right-handed
- Bowling: Right-arm leg-break and googly
- Role: Batsman/all-rounder

Domestic team information
- Years: Team
- 1937–58: Leicestershire
- First-class debut: 29 May 1937 Leicestershire v Kent
- Last First-class: 7 July 1958 Leicestershire v Lancashire

Career statistics
Competition	First-class
Matches	373
Runs scored	12857
Batting average	21.60
100s/50s	9/52
Top score	143
Balls bowled	20814
Wickets	307
Bowling average	35.44
5 wickets in innings	7
10 wickets in match	1
Best bowling	6/42
Catches/stumpings	159/–
- Source: CricketArchive, 20 July 2013

Gerald Lester (27 December 1915 – 26 January 1998) was an English cricketer who played first-class cricket for Leicestershire. He was born at Long Whatton, Leicestershire and died at Leicester.

Lester was a right-handed batsman used for many years by Leicestershire as an opening batsman and a right-arm leg-break and googly bowler who amassed more than 300 rather expensive first-class wickets despite rarely being used as a front-line bowler. Every single one of his 373 first-class matches between 1937 and 1958 was played for Leicestershire.

== Prewar cricket ==
Lester played second eleven cricket in non-competitive local matches from 1935 and made his first-class debut for Leicestershire in 1937: in his first match he caught and bowled the great Leslie Ames, though Ames had made 182 runs at the time.

In 1938, the first few matches played by Jack Walsh in which he took 21 wickets in three games pointed the way for Leicestershire's future bowling, but Wisden Cricketers' Almanack found time to consider Lester too: "Lester had shown promise of developing into a capable leg-break bowler, but last season, although getting plenty of spin on the ball, he failed to find a length and as a result came in for heavy punishment." At this point in his career, Lester was regarded as primarily a bowler and batted in the lower order, with a highest score of 20 which he increased to 44 not out in the 1939 match in which Northamptonshire finally won a County Championship game after four years without a victory. In the previous season in the same match, Lester had set his then best bowling figures with six wickets for 108 runs in Northamptonshire's first innings.

But on his prewar record, Lester was a bit-part player, a lower-order batsman and occasional purveyor of leg-breaks, but far from a first-team regular.

== Postwar cricket ==
Lester returned to Leicestershire for the resumption of first-class cricket in 1946; the county had recruited Vic Jackson as well as Walsh, and Lester's bowling was used less frequently. Ironically, though he had slipped down the pecking order in terms of bowling, Lester's record in 1946 was his best-ever in terms of average, his 31 wickets costing 17.93 runs apiece, ahead of both Walsh and Jackson in the averages. More importantly in terms of the side's needs, however, he started making more runs, and by the end of the season he had frequently become captain Les Berry's opening partner, with Frank Prentice moving down to No 3. The record in 1946 was not spectacular, with 696 runs at an average of 23.20. But in 1947, batting up and down the order, he played regularly in virtually every game for the first time, passed 1,000 runs in a season for the first time and also scored his first century, an unbeaten innings of 106 against Somerset. His batting was not entertaining: "Instinctively, he was a free-scoring player, but the pressures of professional cricket turned him into one of the circuit's stodgier players," Wisden recorded in his obituary in 1999. In a very dry and hot summer and with Leicestershire lacking bowlers, Lester bowled more than 600 overs in 1947, and his 42 wickets included his career-best figures of six for 42 against the South Africans.

For the next 10 years, from 1948 to 1957, Lester was a regular in a Leicestershire side that was usually at or near the bottom of the County Championship – though there was an unexpected flourish in the early 1950s and a third place in 1953. His role was mostly as an opening batsman, and though his figures to modern eyes may appear unimpressive, Leicestershire in this period were normally stronger in bowling than in batting and his place was secure: he made 1000 runs in five seasons in all, and 999, 997 and 977 in three others. His best batting season was 1949 when in all matches he scored 1599 runs with an average of 33.31, the only time in his career when he averaged more than 30 in a season; by contrast, in 1951, he was out of form all season and managed just 560 runs at an average of 14.00, and by the end of the season he'd been sent back down the batting order to No 7 or 8. His highest innings that season was a score of 76 in the game against Oxford University and in the same match he took four for 62 and six for 69 to record the only 10-wicket match of his bowling career. Those 10 wickets contributed to a season's haul of 45, which was the most he ever took in any one year.

Lester's bowling tailed off as he reached 40, and although he retained his place as a batsman until 1957. His highest career score, an innings of 143, was made against the then County Champions, Surrey, at The Oval in 1955 when he was 39. But new recruits in Willie Watson and Alan Revill in 1958 meant more competition for batting places, and after playing half the season he retired to take charge of the second eleven, where he continue to play as captain until 1966. He was later county coach and on the club committee: he was, wrote Wisden, "one of Leicestershire cricket's most devoted sons".
