= Daniel Rowe =

Daniel Rowe may refer to:

- Daniel Rowe (cricketer) (born 1984), Welsh-born English cricketer
- Danny Rowe (footballer, born 1989), English footballer
- Danny Rowe (footballer, born 1992), English footballer
- Daniel Rowe (footballer, born 1995), English footballer
