= Alfred Newcomb =

English cricketer

Personal information
- Full name: Alfred Edwin Newcomb
- Born: 20 November 1873; Market Harborough, Leicestershire, England
- Died: 4 February 1932 (aged 58); Market Harborough, Leicestershire, England
- Batting: Right-handed
- Bowling: Right-arm slow Right-arm fast-medium

Domestic team information
- Years: Team
- 1911: Leicestershire

Career statistics
| Competition | First-class |
|---|---|
| Matches | 1 |
| Runs scored | 1 |
| Batting average | 0.50 |
| 100s/50s | –/– |
| Top score | 1 |
| Balls bowled | 156 |
| Wickets | 1 |
| Bowling average | 74.00 |
| 5 wickets in innings | – |
| 10 wickets in match | – |
| Best bowling | 1/26 |
| Catches/stumpings | –/– |
- Source: Cricinfo, 24 January 2013

Alfred Edwin Newcomb (20 November 1873 – 4 February 1932) was an English cricketer. Newcomb was a right-handed batsman who bowled both right-arm slow and right-arm fast-medium. He was born at Market Harborough, Leicestershire.

Newcomb made a single first-class appearance for Leicestershire against Hampshire in the 1911 County Championship at the United Services Recreation Ground, Portsmouth. In Hampshire's first-innings of 145 all out, Newcomb bowled ten overs which conceded 26 runs, while taking a single wicket, that of Jimmy Stone. In Leicestershire's first-innings of 182 all out, he was run out for a single run. He bowled sixteen wicketless overs in Hampshire's second-innings, which conceded 48 runs. He was again run out in Leicestershire's second-innings, this time for a duck, with Hampshire winning what was his only first-class appearance by 108 runs.

He died at the town of his birth on 4 February 1932.
