= Laurence Thursting =

English cricketer

Personal information
- Full name: Laurence Denis Thursting
- Born: 9 September 1915; Lambeth, London, England
- Died: 15 November 2001 (aged 86); Leicester, Leicestershire
- Batting: Right-handed
- Bowling: Left-arm orthodox spin
- Role: Batsman

Domestic team information
- Years: Team
- 1938–47: Leicestershire
- First-class debut: 14 May 1938 Leicestershire v Hampshire
- Last First-class: 8 August 1947 Leicestershire v Yorkshire

Career statistics
Competition	First-class
Matches	29
Runs scored	882
Batting average	25.20
100s/50s	–/4
Top score	94
Balls bowled	960
Wickets	13
Bowling average	50.76
5 wickets in innings	–
10 wickets in match	–
Best bowling	3/34
Catches/stumpings	10/–
- Source: CricketArchive, 19 July 2013

Laurence Denis Thursting (9 September 1915 – 15 November 2001) was an English cricketer who played first-class cricket for Leicestershire from 1938 to 1947. He was born at Lambeth in London and died at Leicester, Leicestershire.

Thursting was a right-handed batsman and a slow left-arm orthodox spin bowler. He played in a trial match for Surrey in 1932. By 1934, he was playing for Marylebone Cricket Club as one of the professionals employed as ground staff by the club.

He was recruited by Leicestershire in 1938 from the ground-staff at Lord's primarily as a bowler, but had little success at that. Instead he developed very quickly as a right-handed opening batsman, with opportunities opening up because of injuries to Francis Prentice and then Stewie Dempster's regular unavailability. His high point and his highest score came in the match against Warwickshire when his 94, made in four and a quarter hours, helped Leicestershire to save the game after they had to follow on. In the season, he scored 625 runs at an average of 27.17.

From this promising beginning, Thursting's first-class cricket career never really developed. In 1939, though Leicestershire were a poor team and finished bottom of the County Championship, the batting line-up stabilised without Thursting and he played only eight games, batting mostly at No 8, though he managed two fifties from that position. He returned for a single match in 1947 without success.
