= Cecil Boden =

English cricketer

Personal information
- Full name: Cecil Arthur Boden
- Born: 18 December 1890; Countesthorpe, Leicestershire, England
- Died: 31 May 1981 (aged 90); Hampstead Marshall, Berkshire, England
- Batting: Right-handed
- Bowling: Right-arm medium

Domestic team information
- Years: Team
- 1911–1913: Leicestershire

Career statistics
Competition	First-class
Matches	11
Runs scored	196
Batting average	10.31
100s/50s	–/–
Top score	40
Balls bowled	–
Wickets	–
Bowling average	–
5 wickets in innings	–
10 wickets in match	–
Best bowling	–
Catches/stumpings	5/–
- Source: Cricinfo, 10 February 2013

Reverend Cecil Arthur Boden (18 December 1890 – 31 May 1981) was an English cricketer. Boden was a right-handed batsman who bowled right-arm medium pace. He was born at Countesthorpe, Leicestershire and was educated at Christ's Hospital.

Boden made his first-class debut for Leicestershire against Nottinghamshire in the 1911 County Championship at Aylestone Road, Leicester, with him making six further first-class appearances for the county in that season. He made three first-class appearances in 1912, before making a final first-class appearance in the 1913 County Championship against Yorkshire. Boden made a total of eleven first-class appearances, scoring 196 runs at an average of 10.31, with a high score of 40.

He died at Hampstead Marshall, Berkshire on 31 May 1981.
