= Neville Dowen =

English cricketer

Personal information
- Full name: Neville Thomas Dowen
- Born: 18 August 1901; Bulwell, Nottinghamshire, England
- Died: 25 October 1964 (aged 63); Evington, Leicestershire, England
- Batting: Left-handed
- Bowling: Right-arm fast-medium

Domestic team information
- Years: Team
- 1925–1938: Leicestershire

Career statistics
| Competition | First-class |
|---|---|
| Matches | 7 |
| Runs scored | 187 |
| Batting average | 15.58 |
| 100s/50s | 0/0 |
| Top score | 44 |
| Balls bowled | 30 |
| Wickets | 0 |
| Bowling average | – |
| 5 wickets in innings | – |
| 10 wickets in match | – |
| Best bowling | – |
| Catches/stumpings | 3/– |
- Source: Cricinfo, 3 March 2012

Neville Thomas Dowen (18 August 1901 – 25 October 1964) was an English cricketer. Dowen was a left-handed batsman who bowled right-arm fast-medium. He was born at Bulwell, Nottinghamshire.

Dowen made his first-class debut for Leicestershire against Northamptonshire in the 1925 County Championship. He played three further first-class matches in that seasons County Championship. Dowen next appeared in first-class cricket for Leicestershire in the 1935 County Championship against Yorkshire, before making two further first-class appearances for the county, one in the 1936 County Championship against Northamptonshire, and against the touring Australians in 1938. In his seven first-class appearances, he scored a total of 187 runs at an average of 15.58, with a high score of 44.

He died at Evington, Leicestershire, on 25 October 1964.
