= Leonard Hutchinson (cricketer) =

English cricketer

Personal information
- Full name: Leonard Staughton Hutchinson
- Born: 16 January 1901; Anstey, Leicestershire, England
- Died: 2 October 1976 (aged 75); Glenfield, Leicestershire, England
- Batting: Right-handed
- Bowling: Unknown

Domestic team information
- Years: Team
- 1923–1925: Leicestershire

Career statistics
Competition	First-class
Matches	8
Runs scored	65
Batting average	4.64
100s/50s	–/–
Top score	14
Balls bowled	120
Wickets	1
Bowling average	64.00
5 wickets in innings	–
10 wickets in match	–
Best bowling	1/9
Catches/stumpings	8/–
- Source: Cricinfo, 21 January 2013

Leonard Staughton Hutchinson (14 April 1901 – 2 October 1976) was an English cricketer. Hutchinson was a right-handed batsman whose bowling style is unknown. He was born at Anstey, Leicestershire.

Hutchinson made his first-class debut for Leicestershire against Derbyshire in the 1923 County Championship at the Bath Grounds, Ashby-de-la-Zouch. He made seven further first-class appearances for the county, the last of which came against Essex in the 1925 County Championship. He struggled with the bat in his eight first-class matches, scoring a total of 65 runs at an average of 4.64, with a high score of 14, while with the ball he took a single wicket.

He died at Glenfield, Leicestershire on 2 October 1976.
