= William Curtis (cricketer) =

English cricketer

Personal information
- Full name: William Frederick Curtis
- Born: 29 May 1881; Leicester, Leicestershire, England
- Died: 23 December 1962 (aged 81); Leicester, Leicestershire, England
- Batting: Right-handed

Domestic team information
- Years: Team
- 1911–1920: Leicestershire

Career statistics
Competition	First-class
Matches	5
Runs scored	69
Batting average	8.62
100s/50s	–/–
Top score	38
Balls bowled	–
Wickets	–
Bowling average	–
5 wickets in innings	–
10 wickets in match	–
Best bowling	–
Catches/stumpings	–/–
- Source: Cricinfo, 23 January 2013

William Frederick Curtis (29 May 1881 – 23 December 1962) was an English cricketer. Curtis was a right-handed batsman. He was born at Leicester, Leicestershire.

Curtis made his first-class debut for Leicestershire against Sussex in the 1911 County Championship at Aylestone Road, Leicester. He next appeared in first-class cricket for the county in 1920, making four appearances in that seasons County Championship, the last of which came against Somerset. In his five matches, he scored a total of 69 runs at an average of 8.62, with a high score of 38.

He died at the city of his birth on 23 December 1962.
