= Sydney Coulson =

English cricketer

Sydney Samuel Coulson (17 October 1898 – 3 October 1981) was an English cricketer active from 1923 to 1933 who played for Leicestershire. He was born in South Wigston and died in Gainsborough, Lincolnshire. He appeared in 53 first-class matches as a righthanded batsman who scored 1,094 runs with a highest score of 80.
