= Kenneth Raynor =

English cricketer

Kenneth Raynor (23 May 1886 – 15 April 1973) was an English cricketer active from 1906 to 1923 who played for Leicestershire. He was born at Wellington College, Berkshire, and died in Greendale, Rhodesia (now Zimbabwe). He appeared in seven first-class matches as a right-handed batsman who bowled leg break and googly. He scored 125 runs with a highest score of 31 and took one wicket with a best performance of one for 12.
