= Frank Bale =

English cricketer

Personal information
- Full name: Frank Bale
- Born: 7 January 1891; Leicester, Leicestershire, England
- Died: 16 January 1969 (aged 77); Leicester, Leicestershire
- Batting: Left-handed
- Bowling: Left-arm slow-medium
- Role: Bowler

Domestic team information
- Years: Team
- 1920–28: Leicestershire
- First-class debut: 8 May 1920 Leicestershire v Hampshire
- Last First-class: 21 August 1928 Leicestershire v Lancashire

Career statistics
Competition	First-class
Matches	134
Runs scored	1426
Batting average	9.57
100s/50s	–/1
Top score	52
Balls bowled	16094
Wickets	231
Bowling average	27.83
5 wickets in innings	3
10 wickets in match	–
Best bowling	5/62
Catches/stumpings	61/–
- Source: CricketArchive, 15 July 2013

Frank Bale (7 January 1891 – 16 January 1969) was an English cricketer who played first-class cricket for Leicestershire between 1920 and 1928. He was born and died at Leicester, Leicestershire.

Bale was a professional lower-order left-handed batsman and a slow-medium left-arm bowler: reports in consecutive editions of Wisden Cricketers' Almanack in the mid-1920s indicate that he was seen as a contrast to the spin bowling of Ewart Astill and the fast-medium bowling of George Geary, and to Leicestershire's other right-handed bowlers, and not as a spin bowler himself.

Bale made his first-class debut in 1920 and then appeared in around half of Leicestershire's first-class matches in the next four seasons to the end of 1924. His record was not spectacular: in these seasons, his highest score was just 42 and he took five wickets in an innings three times, including what would prove to be his best career bowling figures of five wickets for 62 in the face of a Somerset total of 394 in a heavy defeat in 1922. In both 1925 and 1926 he played regularly. In 1925, though he failed to take five wickets in any innings, he recorded his best aggregate of wickets and best season's bowling average, with 61 wickets at 21.29. In 1926, his wicket tally fell to 49 and his bowling average went up, but he achieved his only first-class score of more than 50 when he hit 52 in 40 minutes to save Leicestershire from an innings defeat by Sussex: the match was still lost by nine wickets.

Bale then reverted to playing in around half of Leicestershire's games in 1927, and after only half a dozen matches in 1928 his first-class career ended.
