= John Pember =

English cricketer

Personal information
- Full name: John Devereaux Dubricious Pember
- Born: 8 June 1940; Creaton, Northamptonshire, England
- Died: 25 January 2007 (aged 66)
- Batting: Left-handed
- Bowling: Right-arm fast-medium

Career statistics
Competition	First-class	List A
Matches	24	10
Runs scored	271	20
Batting average	18.06	3.33
100s/50s	–/1	–/–
Top score	53	9
Balls bowled	2696	360
Wickets	43	8
Bowling average	31.86	31.87
5 wickets in innings	1	–
10 wickets in match	–	n/a
Best bowling	5/45	2/19
Catches/stumpings	11/–	3/–
- Source: Cricinfo, 25 March 2014

John Devereaux Dubricious Pember (8 June 1940 – 25 January 2007) was an English cricketer who played first-class cricket from 1968 to 1971.

He was born in Creaton, Northamptonshire, and attended Wellingborough School, where he played in the first eleven. A club cricketer and landowner in Northamptonshire, he joined Leicestershire and made his first-class debut in 1968 at the age of 28. He appeared intermittently for the county over the next three years, playing 24 first-class matches and 10 one-day matches as a left-handed batsman who bowled right-arm fast-medium.

His highest score was 53, batting at number 11 against Northamptonshire in 1970, and his best bowling figures were 5 for 45 (followed by 2 for 45 in the second innings) in an innings victory over Somerset in 1968.
