= Herbert Bannister =

English cricketer

Herbert Milburn Bannister (3 June 1889 – 18 June 1959) was an English cricketer active from 1912 to 1921 who played for Leicestershire. He was born in Lutterworth and died in Hammersmith. He appeared in eleven first-class matches as a righthanded batsman who bowled right arm medium pace. He scored 227 runs with a highest score of 64 and took 26 wickets with a best performance of five for 90.
