= Mark Blackett =

English cricketer (born 1964)

Personal information
- Full name: Mark Blackett
- Born: 3 February 1964 (age 62); Edmonton, Middlesex, England
- Batting: Right-handed

Domestic team information
- Years: Team
- 1985–1986: Leicestershire

Career statistics
Competition	First-class	List A
Matches	2	6
Runs scored	41	53
Batting average	20.50	26.50
100s/50s	–/–	–/–
Top score	28*	21*
Balls bowled	–	–
Wickets	–	–
Bowling average	–	–
5 wickets in innings	–	–
10 wickets in match	–	–
Best bowling	–	–
Catches/stumpings	–/–	1/–
- Source: Cricinfo, 25 January 2013

Mark Blackett (born 3 February 1964) is a former English cricketer. Blackett was a right-handed batsman. He was born at Edmonton, Middlesex.

Having previously played second eleven cricket for Middlesex without breaking into the starting eleven, Blackett later made his first-class debut for Leicestershire against Nottinghamshire at Trent Bridge in the 1985 County Championship, with him making a second first-class appearance in that season's County Championship against Worcestershire at Grace Road. He scored 41 runs in these two matches, with a high score of 28 not out. He made his debut in List A cricket in that same season against Glamorgan in the John Player Special League. He made five further List A appearances for the county, the last of which came against Somerset in the 1986 John Player Special League. In his six matches in that format, he scored 53 runs with a high score of 21 not out.
