= Gwynn Evans =

Welsh cricketer

Personal information
- Full name: Gwynn Evans
- Born: 13 August 1915; Bala, Merionethshire, Wales
- Died: April 2001 (aged 85); Leicester, Leicestershire, England
- Batting: Right-handed
- Bowling: Right-arm medium-fast

Domestic team information
- Years: Team
- 1949: Leicestershire
- 1939: Glamorgan
- 1938–1939: Oxford University
- 1933–1935: Denbighshire

Career statistics
Competition	First-class
Matches	33
Runs scored	824
Batting average	16.48
100s/50s	–/4
Top score	65*
Balls bowled	4,780
Wickets	72
Bowling average	34.13
5 wickets in innings	2
10 wickets in match	–
Best bowling	6/80
Catches/stumpings	19/–
- Source: Cricinfo, 24 August 2011

Gwynn Evans (13 August 1915 – April 2001) was a Welsh cricketer. Evans was a right-handed batting who bowled right-arm medium-fast. He was born in Bala, Merionethshire.

== Sporting career ==
Evans first appeared in county cricket for Denbighshire in the 1933 Minor Counties Championship against Lincolnshire. He played Minor Counties cricket for Denbighshire from 1933 to 1935, making a total of ten Minor Counties Championship appearances for the Welsh county.

Later, while studying for his degree at Brasenose College, Oxford, Evans made his first-class appearance for Oxford University against Gloucestershire in 1938. He played first-class cricket for the university in 1938 and 1939, making sixteen appearances. In his sixteen matches, he scored 468 runs at an average of 19.50, with a high score of 63 not out. This score came against the Marylebone Cricket Club in 1939. An all-rounder, he took 51 wickets with the ball, which came at a bowling average of 28.68, with best figures of 6/80. These figures, one of two five-wicket hauls he took for the university, came against Leicestershire in 1939.

On the back of his performances for Oxford University in which he gained his Blue, Evans was offered a trial for the latter half of the 1939 season by Glamorgan, making his debut against the touring West Indians at Cardiff Arms Park. Following this match there was talk of him becoming a long-term replacement for Jack Mercer, but with the start of World War II and the subsequent cancellation of county cricket, this was not to be. In his brief time with Glamorgan, Evans scored 164 runs at an average of 12.61, with a high score of 36. With the ball, he took 5 wickets, although these came at a fairly expensive average of 66.20. Following the war he opted not to continue his cricket career, but instead to focus on a career in teaching.

Having moved to Leicestershire, Evans impressed enough in local club cricket there to play for Leicestershire in the 1949 season. Making his debut for the county against the touring New Zealanders, he made nine further appearances for Leicestershire in that season, the last of which came against former county Glamorgan. In his ten first-class appearances for the county, he scored 192 runs at an average of 14.76, with a high score of 65 not out. This score came against Gloucestershire. With the ball, he took 16 wickets at an average of 41.50, with best figures of 4/49. During the 1949 season, Leicestershire captain Stuart Symington abruptly left the county following the County Championship match against Lancashire. Evans was called upon to captain the county for the remaining six matches of that season.

He died in April 2001 in Leicester, Leicestershire.
