= Peter Smith (English cricketer, born 1934) =

English cricketer (born 1934)

Peter Thomas Smith (born 5 October 1934 in Leicester) is an English former cricketer active from 1955 to 1957 who played for Leicestershire. He appeared in fifteen first-class matches as a righthanded batsman who scored 152 runs with a highest score of 40.
