= Thomas Thompson (cricketer) =

English cricketer (born 1934)

Personal information
- Full name: Thomas Thompson
- Born: 24 February 1934 (age 92); Workington, Cumberland, England
- Batting: Right-handed
- Bowling: Right-arm off break

Domestic team information
- Years: Team
- 1963–1964: Leicestershire
- 1955–1974: Cumberland

Career statistics
Competition	First-class
Matches	9
Runs scored	43
Batting average	4.77
100s/50s	–/–
Top score	12
Balls bowled	1,011
Wickets	17
Bowling average	29.23
5 wickets in innings	–
10 wickets in match	–
Best bowling	3/53
Catches/stumpings	2/–
- Source: Cricinfo, 7 February 2013

Thomas Thompson (born 24 February 1934) is an English former cricketer. Thompson was a right-handed batsman who bowled right-arm off break. He was born at Workington, Cumberland.

Thompson made his debut for Cumberland in the 1955 Minor Counties Championship against Durham. Between 1955 and 1961, he made 32 Minor Counties Championship appearances for Cumberland. He joined Leicestershire for the 1963 season, making his first-class debut against Derbyshire at Grace Road in the 1963 County Championship. He made a further first-class appearance in that season against Nottinghamshire, before making seven further appearances in the 1964 County Championship, the last of which came against Essex. A bowler, Thompson took 17 wickets in his nine first-class matches for Leicestershire, which came at an average of 29.23, with best figures of 3/53. A tailend batsman, he scored 43 runs at a batting average of 4.77, with a high score of 12. He returned to playing minor counties cricket for Cumberland in 1967, making a further 46 Minor Counties Championship appearances, the last of which came against the Lancashire Second XI.
