= George Knew Jr =

English cricketer

Personal information
- Full name: George Alan Knew
- Born: 5 March 1954 (age 72); Leicester, Leicestershire, England
- Batting: Right-handed
- Relatives: George Knew senior (father)

Domestic team information
- Years: Team
- 1972–1973: Leicestershire

Career statistics
Competition	First-class	List A
Matches	4	1
Runs scored	59	42
Batting average	11.80	–
100s/50s	–/–	–/–
Top score	25	42*
Balls bowled	–	–
Wickets	–	–
Bowling average	–	–
5 wickets in innings	–	–
10 wickets in match	–	–
Best bowling	–	–
Catches/stumpings	–/–	–/–
- Source: Cricinfo, 30 October 2011

George Alan Knew (born 5 March 1954) is a former English cricketer. Knew was a right-handed batsman. He was born at Leicester, Leicestershire.

Knew made his first-class cricket debut for Leicestershire against Oxford University in 1972. He made three further first-class appearances the following season in the County Championship against Nottinghamshire, Essex and Derbyshire. In his four first-class matches, he scored 59 runs at an average of 11.80, with a high score of 25. He made a single List A appearance against Surrey in the John Player League, ending the match unbeaten on 42, though Leicestershire still lost by 23 runs.

His father, George Knew senior, also played first-class cricket for Leicestershire.
