= Edwin Riley =

English cricketer

Personal information
- Full name: Edwin Riley
- Born: 21 March 1867; Stoney Stanton, Leicestershire
- Died: 4 May 1936 (aged 69); Stoney Stanton, Leicestershire, England

Domestic team information
- Years: Team
- 1895: Leicestershire

Career statistics
Competition	First-class
Matches	2
Runs scored	13
Batting average	6.50
100s/50s	0/0
Top score	8*
Balls bowled	5
Wickets	0
Bowling average	–
5 wickets in innings	–
10 wickets in match	–
Best bowling	–
Catches/stumpings	0/–
- Source: Cricinfo, 1 March 2012

Edwin Riley (21 March 1867 – 4 May 1936) was an English cricketer. Riley's batting and bowling styles are unknown. He was born at Stoney Stanton, Leicestershire.

Riley made two first-class appearances for Leicestershire in 1895, against Lancashire at Old Trafford, and Dublin University at Grace Road. Against Lancashire, he made scores of 8 not out in Leicestershire's first-innings, and a single run in their second, during which he was dismissed by Arthur Mold. Against Dublin University, Riley scored 4 runs in Leicestershire's first-innings, before being dismissed by Ernest Ensor, while in their second-innings he wasn't required to bat.

He died at the village of his birth on 4 May 1936.
