= Frederick Mills (cricketer) =

English cricketer

Personal information
- Full name: Frederick Mills
- Born: 10 July 1898; Leicester, Leicestershire, England
- Died: 4 November 1929 (aged 31); Leicester, Leicestershire, England
- Batting: Left-handed
- Bowling: Slow left-arm orthodox

Domestic team information
- Years: Team
- 1921–1923: Leicestershire

Career statistics
Competition	First-class
Matches	5
Runs scored	69
Batting average	13.80
100s/50s	–/–
Top score	30*
Balls bowled	–
Wickets	–
Bowling average	–
5 wickets in innings	–
10 wickets in match	–
Best bowling	–
Catches/stumpings	–/–
- Source: Cricinfo, 14 February 2013

Frederick Mills (10 July 1898 – 4 November 1929) was an English cricketer. Mills was a left-handed batsman who bowled slow left-arm orthodox. He was born at Leicester, Leicestershire.

Mills made his first-class debut for Leicestershire against Hampshire in the 1921 County Championship at the United Services Recreation Ground, Portsmouth. He later made four further first-class appearances for the county in the 1923 County Championship against Kent, Derbyshire, Warwickshire and Hampshire. In his five first-class matches for Leicestershire, Mills scored 69 runs at an average of 13.80, with a high score of 30 not out.

He died at the city of his birth on 4 November 1929.
