= David Wenlock =

English cricketer

Personal information
- Full name: David Alan Wenlock
- Born: 16 April 1959 (age 67); Leicester, Leicestershire, England
- Batting: Right-handed
- Bowling: Right-arm medium

Domestic team information
- Years: Team
- 1985–1986: Staffordshire
- 1980–1982: Leicestershire

Career statistics
| Competition | First-class | List A |
|---|---|---|
| Matches | 10 | 33 |
| Runs scored | 148 | 162 |
| Batting average | 16.44 | 9.69 |
| 100s/50s | –/1 | –/– |
| Top score | 62 | 11 |
| Balls bowled | 486 | 1,200 |
| Wickets | 7 | 32 |
| Bowling average | 38.28 | 26.37 |
| 5 wickets in innings | – | – |
| 10 wickets in match | – | – |
| Best bowling | 3/50 | 3/32 |
| Catches/stumpings | 3/– | 7/– |
- Source: Cricinfo, 7 July 2011

David Alan Wenlock (born 16 April 1959) is a former English cricketer. Wenlock was a right-handed batsman who bowled right-arm medium pace. He was born in Leicester, Leicestershire.

Wenlock made his first-class debut for Leicestershire against Oxford University in 1980. He 9 further first-class appearances for Leicestershire, the last of which came against Northamptonshire in the 1992 County Championship. He scored 148 runs in his 10 first-class matches, at an average of 16.44, with a high score of 62. This score, his only first-class half century, came against the touring Sri Lankans in 1981. With the ball, he took 7 wickets at bowling average of 38.28, with best figures of 3/50. He made his List A debut for Leicestershire in the 1980 John Player League against Sussex. He made 31 further List A appearances for Leicestershire, the last of which came against Northamptonshire in the 1982 John Player League. In his 33 limited-overs appearances for the county, he scored 126 runs at an average of 10.50, with a high score of 22. With the ball, he took 32 wickets at an average of 24.96, with best figures of 3/32.

He later joined Staffordshire, making his debut for the county against Hertfordshire in the 1985 Minor Counties Championship. He played Minor counties cricket for Staffordshire in 1985 and 1986, making 2 appearances each in the Minor Counties Championship and MCCA Knockout Trophy. He made his only List A appearance for Staffordshire against Nottinghamshire in the 1985 NatWest Trophy. In this match, he was dismissed for a duck by Kevin Saxelby, while with the ball he bowled 12 wicket-less overs for the cost of 45 runs.
