= John Burdett (cricketer) =

English cricketer

John Burdett (16 August 1888 – 16 April 1974) was an English cricketer. He was a right-handed batsman who played for Leicestershire. He was born in Blaby and died in Melton Mowbray.

Burdett made a single first-class appearance for the team, against Northamptonshire in 1919. From the middle order, he scored a duck in the first innings in which he batted, and a single run in the second.
