= Howard Jeffery =

English cricketer

Howard William James Jeffery (5 May 1944 – 17 April 2008) was an English cricketer active from 1963 to 1974 who played for Leicestershire. He was born in Workington and died in Whitehaven. He appeared in two first-class matches as a righthanded batsman who bowled right arm fast medium. He scored six runs with a highest score of 6 and took two wickets with a best performance of two for 77.
