= Thomas Warren (cricketer) =

English cricketer (1859–1936)

Thomas Henry Warren (8 October 1859 – 22 April 1936) was an English cricketer active from 1882 to 1895 who played for Leicestershire. He appeared in fifteen first-class matches as a righthanded batsman who bowled right arm fast medium. He scored 313 runs with a highest score of 33 and took two wickets with a best performance of two for 34.
