= Nevill Lee =

English cricketer

Nevill Bernard Lee (13 August 1898 – 21 July 1978) was an English cricketer active from 1922 to 1924 who played for Leicestershire. He was born in Barlestone and died in Blackpool. He appeared in eight first-class matches as a righthanded batsman who scored 117 runs with a highest score of 62.
