= William Flamson =

English cricketer (1904–1945)

Personal information
- Full name: William Henry Flamson
- Born: 12 August 1904; Heather, Leicestershire, England
- Died: 9 January 1945 (aged 40); Heather, Leicestershire, England
- Batting: Right-handed
- Bowling: Right-arm medium-fast
- Role: Bowler

Domestic team information
- Years: Team
- 1934–39: Leicestershire
- First-class debut: 16 June 1934 Leicestershire v Derbyshire
- Last First-class: 29 August 1939 Leicestershire v Glamorgan

Career statistics
Competition	First-class
Matches	49
Runs scored	351
Batting average	7.46
100s/50s	–/1
Top score	50*
Balls bowled	10522
Wickets	151
Bowling average	32.92
5 wickets in innings	7
10 wickets in match	–
Best bowling	7/46
Catches/stumpings	23/–
- Source: CricketArchive, 10 August 2013

William Henry Flamson (12 August 1904 – 9 January 1945) was an English cricketer who played first-class cricket for Leicestershire between 1934 and 1939. Flamson was born and died at Heather, Leicestershire.

Flamson was a right-arm medium-fast bowler and a right-handed tail-end batsman. He appeared in a couple of first-class matches in the 1934 season but made little impression, and did not return until 1937 when he was taken on to the Leicestershire full-time staff, and won praise from Wisden Cricketers' Almanack. In what it termed one of Leicestershire's worst ever seasons, it wrote, "probably the only satisfactory feature of the bowling was the advance of Flamson, who in his first full season of county cricket, accomplished some splendid performances". It went on: "He developed as the season progressed and towards the close often carried the attack on his shoulders. Powerfully built and with a run-up similar to that of George Geary, he put plenty of 'shoulder' into his medium-fast deliveries and had the knack of making the ball keep unexpectedly low."

Flamson took 60 wickets in 19 matches in 1937 at the high average of 33.78 runs per wicket. Against Nottinghamshire in his second match of the season he took seven first innings wickets for 46 runs and these remained the best figures of his career. He achieved his best match figures in Leicestershire's only victory of the season, the game against Hampshire, when he took six for 61 and three for 51 to finish with nine for 112 in the game.

Flamson was still a regular member of the side though he took fewer wickets in 1938 – 53 wickets in the season at the lower average of 27.41 – and he missed a month of the season through injury. His one innings of note as a batsman was in this season: he made an unbeaten 50 in half an hour in the game against Northamptonshire. In 1939, in an unsuccessful team that finished at the bottom of the County Championship, Flamson was himself not successful, taking 36 wickets at the very high average of 38.16. He lost his place in the team at the start of July, though he returned for a single match towards the end of August which proved to be the last match of his first-class cricket career.

He died at the age of 40 in January 1945, before first-class cricket had resumed.
