= Norman Dunham =

English cricketer

Norman Dunham (9 December 1925 – June 2005) was an English cricketer. He was a right-handed batsman and a right-arm medium-pace bowler who played for Leicestershire. He was born in Quorn and died in Leicester.

Dunham made a single first-class appearance for the side, against Hampshire in 1949. Batting in the tailend, he scored 3 runs in the first innings and 12 not out in the second.
