= Gordon Salmon =

English cricketer

Personal information
- Full name: Gordon Hedley Salmon
- Born: 1 August 1894; Leicester, England
- Died: 13 June 1978 (aged 83); Exmouth, England
- Batting: Right-handed

Domestic team information
- Years: Team
- 1913–1929: Leicestershire
- Source: Cricinfo

Gordon Hedley Salmon (1 August 1894 – 13 June 1978) was an English cricketer active from 1913 to 1929 who played for Leicestershire. He was born in Leicester and died in Exmouth. He appeared in 47 first-class matches as a righthanded batsman who scored 1,273 runs with a highest score of 72.
