= William Riley (Leicestershire cricketer) =

English cricketer

William Nairn Riley (24 November 1892 – 20 November 1955) was an English cricketer who played for Cambridge University and Leicestershire from 1911 to 1914. He appeared in 55 first-class matches as a right-handed batsman who bowled right-arm fast medium. He scored 1,620 runs with a highest score of 121 and took seven wickets with a best performance of two for 12.

Riley was born in Appleby Magna, Leicestershire, and educated at St Catharine's College, Cambridge. He lost a leg on active service during World War I and his other leg a few years later. He worked as a solicitor in Brighton. He died in Hove, Sussex.
