= Clement Starmer =

English cricketer

Clement Edwin Starmer (2 December 1895 – 25 July 1978) was an English cricketer active from 1924 to 1928 who played for Leicestershire. He was born in Cosby and died in North Shields. He appeared in three first-class matches as a righthanded batsman who bowled right arm fast medium. He scored nineteen runs with a highest score of 8.
