= Stuart Symington (cricketer) =

English cricketer (1926–2009)

Personal information
- Full name: Stuart Johnston Symington
- Born: 16 September 1926; Bexhill-on-Sea, Sussex, England
- Died: 11 December 2009 (aged 83); Hereford, England
- Batting: Right-handed
- Bowling: Right-arm fast-medium
- Role: All-rounder

Domestic team information
- Years: Team
- 1948–1949: Leicestershire
- FC debut: 30 June 1948 Leicestershire v Hampshire
- Last FC: 12 August 1949 Leicestershire v Lancashire

Career statistics
Competition	First-class
Matches	23
Runs scored	744
Batting average	21.88
100s/50s	0/3
Top score	65
Balls bowled	2,753
Wickets	36
Bowling average	40.22
5 wickets in innings	1
10 wickets in match	0
Best bowling	5/45
Catches/stumpings	13/–
- Source: CricketArchive, 3 January 2010

Stuart Johnston Symington (16 September 1926 – 11 December 2009) played first-class cricket for Leicestershire as an amateur in 1948 and 1949. He was captain of the Leicestershire side in 1949. After little more than a year in full-time cricket, he resumed a career in the Army. He was born at Bexhill-on-Sea, Sussex in 1926.

== Cricket career ==
A right-handed middle-order batsman and a right-arm fast-medium bowler, Symington was educated at Canford School and played for Leicestershire in wartime matches. He made his first-class debut in a couple of matches in the 1948 season. He took four wickets in his first match against Hampshire, and this was followed by scores of 21 and 40 in the second game, which was against Essex. In 1948, Leicestershire had appointed the professional, Les Berry, as captain, only the second appointment of a professional by one of the first-class counties since the 1890s (the previous instance had also been by Leicestershire, when Ewart Astill was appointed captain for the 1935 season). In both 1935 and 1948, the appointment had been necessitated because no amateur was available to lead the team: Wisden also reported that "possibly affected by the cares of captaincy", Berry "did not reproduce the form of previous years".

For the 1949 season, Symington was offered the captaincy of the county side and accepted, although he had played only two matches at this point. The move was not a success. Though Berry returned to form, the side as a whole played badly, and, having finished in 11th place out of 17 in the County Championship in 1948, Leicestershire slipped to bottom place in 1949. Under Symington's captaincy, only two matches were won, though there was a third victory late in the season after he had departed.

Symington's own record for the season was respectable: he batted mostly at No 6 or No 7, and made 659 runs at an average of 21.25. There were three scores of more than 50, with the highest being 65, made in the match against Essex at Leicester. Bowling was the weakness of the Leicestershire side as a whole, and in the absence of alternatives Symington was cast in the role of opening bowler for most of the season. He took only 30 wickets in the season at the high average of 43.73. There was one good bowling day, early in the season: in Leicestershire's first home match, he took five Derbyshire wickets for 45 runs, and this was the only five-wicket innings performance of his career.

Symington's departure from Leicestershire appears to have been abrupt. He captained the side in the match against Lancashire at Blackpool, but that was his last appearance for the team. The former Oxford University and Glamorgan all-rounder Gwynn Evans, now a schoolmaster in Leicestershire, took over as captain for the remaining six matches of the 1949 season. For 1950, Leicestershire recruited the former Worcestershire amateur Charles Palmer as both secretary and captain. Symington did not play first-class cricket again.

== After cricket ==
Symington had been commissioned as a second lieutenant in the King's Royal Rifle Corps in 1946. He was promoted to lieutenant in 1948 (backdated to November 1947). When he finished with first-class cricket, he resumed his army career as a lieutenant; in 1953, he was promoted to be a captain in the King's Royal Rifle Corps. One of his jobs in the army was to be an aide-de-camp to the governor of the Bahamas. He retired from the regular army in 1958 and joined the Territorial Army, being promoted to major on his retirement from the regular army. He resigned his commission in 1959.

Symington joined the family firm of R. and W. H. Symington in Market Harborough as a director; the company made corsets and its mill is now the site of the Harborough Museum. In the 1970 general election, he stood unsuccessfully as the Conservative Party candidate for the Leicester North West seat, losing by more than 2,000 votes to the Labour candidate Greville Janner. He died at Hereford in 2009.
