= Terry Stretton =

English cricketer (1953–2018)

Personal information
- Full name: Terry Kevin Stretton
- Born: 23 May 1953; Cosby, Leicestershire, England
- Died: 12 December 2018 (aged 65); Leicestershire
- Batting: Right-handed
- Bowling: Right-arm medium

Domestic team information
- Years: Team
- 1972–1975: Leicestershire

Career statistics
Competition	First-class
Matches	6
Runs scored	20
Batting average	5.00
100s/50s	–/–
Top score	6*
Balls bowled	706
Wickets	4
Bowling average	84.50
5 wickets in innings	–
10 wickets in match	–
Best bowling	2/71
Catches/stumpings	2/–
- Source: Cricinfo, 25 January 2013

Terry Kevin Stretton (23 May 1953 – 12 December 2018) was an English cricketer. Stretton was a right-handed batsman who bowled right-arm medium pace. He was born at Cosby, Leicestershire.

Stretton made his first-class debut for Leicestershire against Oxford University in 1972. On the fringes of the Leicestershire first eleven, he made a further appearance in 1972 against Yorkshire in the County Championship, while the following season he made a single appearance in the 1973 County Championship against Lancashire. He made two further first-class appearances in 1974, against the touring Pakistanis and Middlesex in the County Championship, before making a final first-class appearance against the touring Australians in 1975. In his six first-class appearances, he took 4 wickets at an average of 84.50, with best figures of 2/71. With the bat, he scored 20 runs at a batting average of 5.00, with a high score of 6 not out.

Stretton died in December 2018 following a brief illness.
