= Rowland Needham =

English cricketer (1878–1963)

Rowland Needham (10 November 1878 – 28 April 1963) was an English cricketer. He was a left-handed batsman and left-arm medium-pace bowler who played for Leicestershire. He was born in Huncote and died in Victoria Park.

Needham made a single first-class appearance, during the 1911 season, against the touring Indians. He scored 15 not out in the first innings in which he batted, and 16 runs in the second innings, having switched from the tailend to the opening order.

Needham took two wickets with the ball during the match.
