= Geoffrey Wykes =

English cricketer

Geoffrey Wykes (22 November 1890 – 1 May 1926) was an English cricketer who played for Leicestershire. He was born in Clarendon Park, Leicester and died in Hull.

Wykes played two first-class matches for Leicestershire during the 1923 season. His debut came against Surrey, against whom he scored a pair, having been caught and bowled by Test cricketer Percy Fender in the first innings and caught by Andy Sandham off Fender's bowling in the second.

Wykes' second and final match saw him score two runs in the first innings and a duck in the second innings of the match. Wykes died less than three years after the end of his final first-class match.
