= David Kirby (cricketer) =

English cricketer (1939–2021)

Personal information
- Full name: David Kirby
- Born: 18 January 1939; Darlington, Co. Durham, England
- Died: 7 October 2021 (aged 82)
- Batting: Right-handed
- Bowling: Right-arm off-spin

Domestic team information
- Years: Team
- 1959–1961: Cambridge University
- 1959–1964: Leicestershire

Career statistics
Competition	First-class
Matches	117
Runs scored	4105
Batting average	19.64
100s/50s	3/20
Top score	118
Balls bowled	9465
Wickets	113
Bowling average	37.61
5 wickets in innings	1
10 wickets in match	0
Best bowling	5/76
Catches/stumpings	51/–
- Source: Cricinfo, 21 September 2013

David Kirby (18 January 1939 – 7 October 2021) was an English cricketer who had a short but intensive career in first-class cricket for Cambridge University and Leicestershire between 1959 and 1964 and was captain of both. After his cricket career, he taught at his former school, St Peter's School, York.

== University cricketer ==
Born in Darlington, County Durham, Kirby was an outstanding schoolboy cricketer at St Peter's School, York, and played for the Public Schools cricket team in the annual match against the Combined Services at Lord's in 1957 as a middle-order batsman. Going to Cambridge University in autumn 1958, he was picked for virtually every first-class match for the University side in 1959 season as an opening batsman and made more runs than anyone else in a pretty unsuccessful university season: the team won only one game out of 19 first-class matches. He made one of only three centuries for the team, an innings of 109 in the match against Warwickshire. With the off-spin bowler Alan Hurd a regular member of the side, Kirby's own off-spin was used sparingly, but he took 26 university wickets at an average of 27.84, which put him second in the university's averages and ahead of all the more regular bowlers. When the university term was over, he joined Leicestershire with limited success; at the end of the season, too, he was picked for the Gentlemen v Players match in the Scarborough Festival. All this cricket – and playing for two rather weak teams in a season of almost continuous sunshine, which meant he batted twice in all but one of his 27 first-class games – gave him a total of 1102 runs for the season and an average of 21.60, the lowest average of any of the 30 or so batsmen who have scored 1,000 runs in their debut season. He also took 41 wickets at an average of 26.36.

In 1960, Kirby had a similar season full of cricket, but was less successful, failing to make 1000 runs and averaging only 16 with the bat, while the cost of his 24 wickets was more than 50 runs per wicket. In 1961, he was captain of the Cambridge team, but again he struggled for runs during the university season and batted in the lower middle order, though his off-spin was more important than before as Hurd was no longer at the university. Kirby took 36 wickets at an average of 34.44 for Cambridge, and they included a return of five for 76 in the match against Leicestershire, which was the only five-wicket return of his career. The 1961 University Match was a tedious draw in which the defensive cricket played by both teams was criticised; in one two-hour session Kirby, "bowling medium-paced off cutters", took three wickets for 32 runs off 24 overs.

== County cricketer ==
At the end of the 1961 university cricket season, Kirby joined Leicestershire as usual, but this time he was employed as "cricket secretary", a post that enabled him to maintain his amateur status. This proved to be Kirby's most successful period as a batsman and he averaged more than 30 runs an innings in his 10 games for Leicestershire. Against Yorkshire, innings of 62 and 91, plus three-second innings wickets, led his team to a victory by 149 runs, the biggest win over Yorkshire since the Second World War. And against Nottinghamshire he hit four sixes in an innings of 30 which set Leicestershire off on a successful run chase in which the team scored at 94 runs an hour, a break-neck speed for a rather staid era of cricket. By the end of the 1961 season, Kirby had scored 1158 runs at an average of 23.63 and taken 46 wickets – the highest aggregates of runs and wickets and the highest batting average of his career.

A combination of batting solidity and three bowlers in the top 10 of the English averages propelled Leicestershire in 1961 to ninth in the County Championship, a long way above their accustomed position at or near the bottom of the table. When Kirby was appointed captain for 1962, the expectations were high; the reality was a swift descent to the bottom of the table again. "This looked to be the right combination for a successful summer, but things did not work out that way," Wisden wrote. Though the team was beset by injuries, Kirby as captain did not escape criticism: "A feeling prevailed that the committee had asked too much of Kirby, who led Cambridge University the previous year, in giving him the captaincy without a period of 'apprenticeship' under (Maurice) Hallam." Kirby's own record was not impressive: he made 1007 runs in the season, but his average of just 19.00 is the fifth lowest of any player scoring 1000 runs in an English season. He took only two wickets in the season. He hit his highest first-class score of 118 for Leicestershire against Kent, but then declared with just four wickets down and watched as Kent amassed a huge score to win the game by an innings.

== School teacher ==
After Leicestershire finished at the bottom of the County Championship table in 1962 Kirby resigned and began his teaching career at St Peter's School in York where he had been a pupil. And there he stayed, reappearing for Leicestershire in just two matches in the 1964 season, without success. Writing in the schools cricket report in the 2013 edition of Wisden, Douglas Henderson said: "There have been fewer greater servants of schools cricket than David Kirby of St Peter's, York, who retired in 2012. He played for the school for five years in the 1950s ... went on to captain Cambridge University and Leicestershire, then returned to St Peter's in 1968 to take charge of their cricket for the next 44 years." He also taught French and German.

Kirby died in October 2021, aged 82.
