= Bernard Tyler =

English cricketer

Bernard Tyler was an English cricketer active from 1923 to 1932 who played for Northamptonshire (Northants) and Leicestershire. He was born in Ridlington, Rutland on 29 April 1902 and died in Bath, Somerset on 10 November 1987. He appeared in fourteen first-class matches as a righthanded batsman who bowled right arm fast. He scored 135 runs with a highest score of 26 and took eleven wickets with a best performance of two for 13.
