= Joel Pope =

English cricketer

Personal information
- Full name: Joel Ian Pope
- Born: 23 October 1988 (age 38); Ashford, Middlesex, England
- Nickname: Popey
- Height: 5 ft 8 in (1.73 m)
- Batting: Right-handed
- Role: Wicket-keeper
- Relatives: Ben Scott (uncle)

Domestic team information
- Years: Team
- 2011–present: Buckinghamshire
- 2008–2010: Leicestershire

Career statistics
Competition	List A
Matches	3
Runs scored	22
Batting average	7.33
100s/50s	–/–
Top score	9
Balls bowled	–
Wickets	–
Bowling average	–
5 wickets in innings	–
10 wickets in match	–
Best bowling	–
Catches/stumpings	3/1
- Source: cricinfo.com, 1 September 2011

Joel Ian Pope (born 23 October 1988) is an English cricketer. He is a right-handed batsman who fields as a wicket-keeper. He was born in Ashford, Middlesex and educated at Whitton School.

At the end of the 2007 season, Leicestershire offered Pope a contract. He made his debut for the county the following season in a List A match against Derbyshire in the 2008 Pro40. However, with the presence of the Paul Nixon and Tom New in the Leicestershire squad, Pope found his opportunities limited to playing for the Leicestershire Seconds. He wouldn't appear for Leicestershire again until the 2010 season, when he made two further List A appearances, against Warwickshire and Kent. In his three List A appearances for the county, he scored 22 runs at an average of 7.33, with a high score of 9. Behind the stumps he took 3 catches and made a single stumping. He made no first-class or Twenty20 appearances for the county, and was released at the end of the 2010 season.

For the 2011 season, he was selected in the Unicorns squad for the Clydesdale Bank 40, but is yet to feature for the team. Later in 2011, he joined Buckinghamshire. He made his debut for the county in Minor Counties Championship against Cumberland.

His uncle is the Worcestershire wicket-keeper Ben Scott.
