= Riaz-ur-Rehman =

Pakistani cricketer

Riaz-ur-Rehman Bhatti (1940 – 10 July 1966) was a cricketer. An opening batsman and wicketkeeper, he was born in India in 1940 and migrated to Pakistan where he represented Lahore, Karachi and Rawalpindi from January 1959 to December 1961.

He made his eighth and final first-class appearance for Leicestershire County Cricket Club, his county debut against Oxford University in 1966, scoring 18 and 4, a month before his death in a road accident in Loughborough, England.
