= Alf Broughton =

English cricketer

Ernest Alfred Broughton (22 April 1905 – 19 February 1982) was an English cricketer active from 1928 to 1933 who played for Leicestershire. He was born and died in Wigston. He appeared in 25 first-class matches as a righthanded batsman who scored 482 runs with a highest score of 61.
