= Harold Marriott =

English cricketer

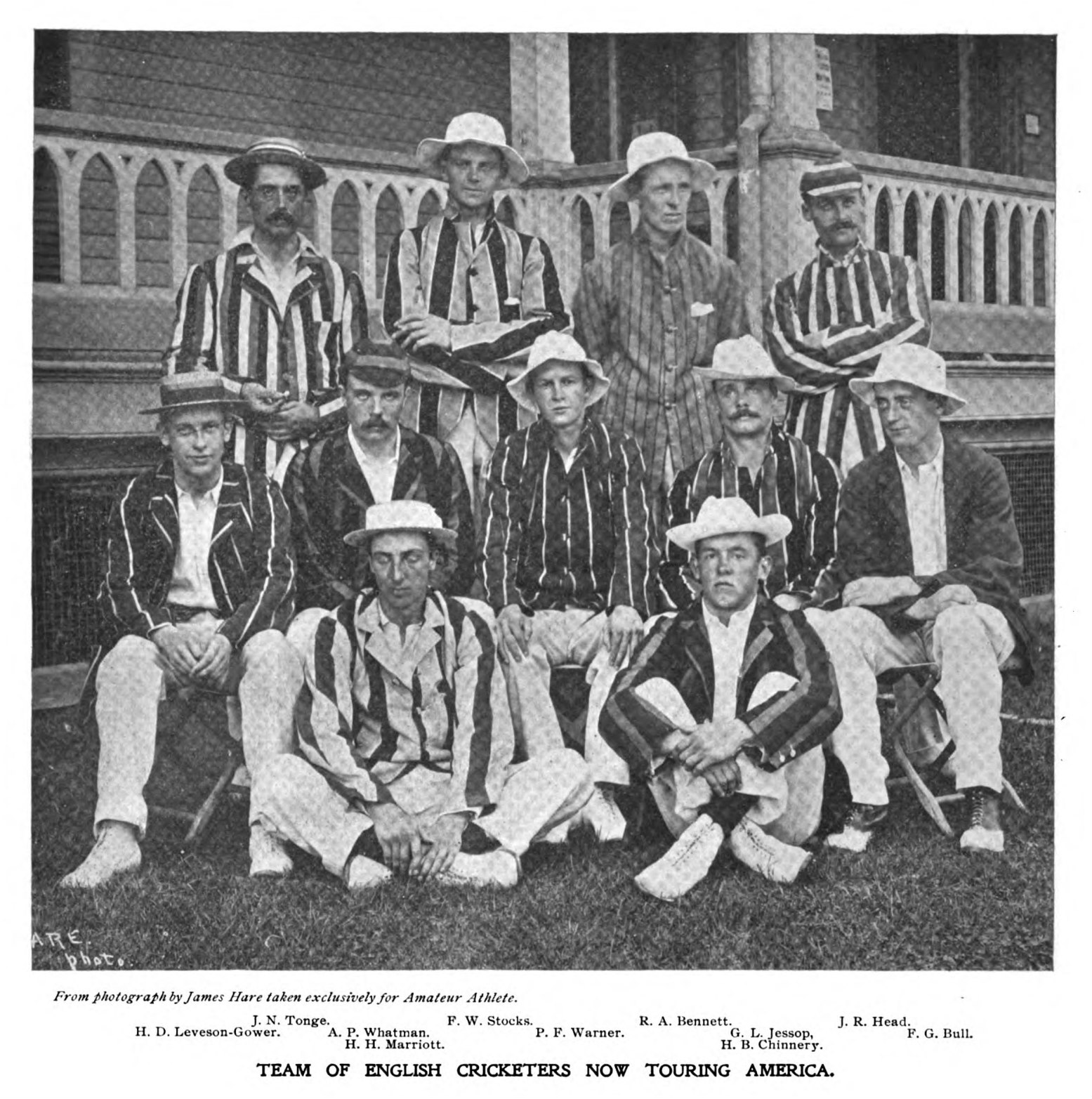
Marriott, sitting left in front row, on North American tour in 1897.

Harold Henry Marriott (20 January 1875 – 15 November 1949) was an English cricketer active from 1894 to 1919 who played for Leicestershire.

He was born in Oadby, Leicestershire, the fourth son of Sir Charles Marriott (1834–1910), an eminent surgeon in Leicestershire who was captain of Kibworth Cricket Club. Harold Marriott was educated at Malvern College and Clare College, Cambridge. He played cricket for Cambridge University 1895–98 and for Leicestershire 1894–1902. On 5 August 1901, while playing for Leicestershire CCC, against London County Cricket Club at Ayleston Road, Marriott caught the famous W. G. Grace for a duck off the bowling of his teammate, William Ward Odell. He went to the United States in 1895 with a team led by F. Mitchell and in 1897 with P. F. Warner's team. He appeared in 87 first-class matches as a righthanded batsman who bowled right arm medium pace. He scored 3,266 runs with a highest score of 146* among five centuries, and took eight wickets with a best performance of four for 60. He died in Kensington, west London.
