= Edmund Phillips =

English cricketer (1932–2020)

Edmund Frederick Phillips
Personal information
- Born: 12 January 1932; Bridgnorth
- Died: 18 February 2020 (aged 88)

Domestic team information
- Years: Team
- Leicestershire

Career statistics
Competition
Matches	32
Runs scored	629
Batting average
100s/50s
Top score	55
Balls bowled
Wickets
Bowling average
5 wickets in innings
10 wickets in match
Best bowling
Catches/stumpings
- Source: Cricinfo, 18 April 2021

Edmund Frederick Phillips (12 January 1932 – 18 February 2020) was an English cricketer active from 1955 to 1959 who played for Leicestershire. He appeared in 32 first-class matches as a righthanded batsman who scored 629 runs with a highest score of 55.
