= Michael Evans (cricketer) =

English cricketer

Personal information
- Full name: Michael Evans
- Born: 3 May 1908; Leicester, Leicestershire, England
- Died: 14 November 1974 (aged 66); Leicester, Leicestershire, England
- Batting: Right-handed
- Bowling: Right-arm fast-medium

Domestic team information
- Years: Team
- 1946: Leicestershire

Career statistics
Competition	First-class
Matches	2
Runs scored	26
Batting average	8.66
100s/50s	–/–
Top score	14*
Balls bowled	331
Wickets	6
Bowling average	21.66
5 wickets in innings	–
10 wickets in match	–
Best bowling	3/30
Catches/stumpings	–/–
- Source: Cricinfo, 21 January 2013

Michael Evans (3 May 1908 – 14 November 1974) was an English cricketer. Evans was a right-handed batsman who bowled right-arm fast-medium. He was born at Leicester, Leicestershire.

Evans made two first-class appearances for Leicestershire against Surrey and Glamorgan in the 1946 County Championship. In his two matches he scored a total of 26 runs at an average of 8.66, with a high score of 14 not out. With the ball, he took 6 wickets at a bowling average of 21.66, with best figures of 3/30.

He died at the city of his birth on 14 November 1974.
