= Atul Sachdeva =

English cricketer

Personal information
- Full name: Atul Sachdeva
- Born: 22 August 1980 (age 46); Preston, Lancashire, England
- Batting: Right-handed
- Bowling: Leg break

Domestic team information
- Years: Team
- 1999: Leicestershire

Career statistics
Competition	FC
Matches	1
Runs scored	0
Batting average	0.00
100s/50s	–/–
Top score	0*
Balls bowled	72
Wickets	1
Bowling average	54.00
5 wickets in innings	–
10 wickets in match	–
Best bowling	1/32
Catches/stumpings	–/–
- Source: Cricinfo, 8 May 2010

Atul Sachdeva (born 22 August 1980 in Preston, Lancashire) is an English cricketer. Sachdeva was a right-handed batsman and a leg break bowler.

Sachdeva represented Leicestershire in a single first-class match in 1999 against Derbyshire. Sachdeva was unbeaten on 0 when Leicestershire's first innings came to an end. In their second innings he was dismissed for a duck by Matthew Cassar. In Derbyshire's second innings, he took the wicket of Cassar. This was his only wicket in first-class cricket.
