= Geoffrey Coe =

English cricketer

Personal information
- Full name: Geoffrey Coe
- Born: 29 March 1943 (age 83); Earl Shilton, Leicestershire, England
- Batting: Right-handed
- Bowling: Left-arm medium

Domestic team information
- Years: Team
- 1963: Leicestershire

Career statistics
Competition	First-class
Matches	1
Runs scored	–
Batting average	–
100s/50s	–/–
Top score	–
Balls bowled	156
Wickets	2
Bowling average	38.50
5 wickets in innings	–
10 wickets in match	–
Best bowling	1/26
Catches/stumpings	–/–
- Source: Cricinfo, 2 March 2012

Geoffrey Coe (born 29 March 1943) is a former English cricketer. Coe was a right-handed batsman who bowled left-arm medium pace. He was born at Earl Shilton, Leicestershire.

Coe made a single first-class appearance for Leicestershire against Cambridge University at Fenner's in 1963. Coe wasn't called upon to bat in either of Leicestershire's innings, while with the ball he took the wickets of Edward Antrobus in Cambridge University's first-innings, and Richard Hutton in their second, bowling a total of 26 overs and conceding 77 runs for his two wickets. Leicestershire won the match by 9 wickets. This was his only major appearance for Leicestershire.
