= Luke Radford =

English cricketer (born 1988)

Luke Anthony Radford (born 3 June 1988 in Worcester) is an English cricketer active in 2011 who played for Leicestershire. He appeared in one first-class match as a righthanded batsman who bowled right arm medium fast. He scored no runs and took two wickets with a best performance of two for 47.

Luke is the son of former test cricketer Neal Radford
