= William Parkins =

English cricketer

Personal information
- Full name: William Richard Parkins
- Born: 20 August 1925; Glenfield, Leicestershire, England
- Died: 1 November 1969 (aged 44); Leicester, Leicestershire, England
- Batting: Right-handed

Domestic team information
- Years: Team
- 1950: Leicestershire

Career statistics
| Competition | First-class |
|---|---|
| Matches | 5 |
| Runs scored | 125 |
| Batting average | 12.50 |
| 100s/50s | –/– |
| Top score | 39 |
| Balls bowled | – |
| Wickets | – |
| Bowling average | – |
| 5 wickets in innings | – |
| 10 wickets in match | – |
| Best bowling | – |
| Catches/stumpings | 2/– |
- Source: Cricinfo, 9 February 2013

William Richard Parkins (20 August 1925 – 1 November 1969) was an English cricketer. Parkins was a right-handed batsman. He was born at Glenfield, Leicestershire.

Parkins made his first-class debut for Leicestershire against Cambridge University at Fenner's in 1950. He made four further first-class appearances in 1950, the last of which came against Worcestershire in the County Championship. In his five matches, he scored 125 runs at an average of 12.50, with a high score of 39.

He died at Leicester, Leicestershire on 1 November 1969.
