= Walter Smith (cricketer) =

English cricketer

Walter Alfred Smith (23 February 1913 – 4 October 2007) was an English cricketer active from 1928 to 1946 who played for Leicestershire. He was born in Leicester and died in Bexhill-on-Sea. He played in fifteen first-class matches as a righthanded batsman who bowled right arm slow. He scored 754 runs with a highest score of 125* and took three wickets with a best performance of one for 4.
