= Steve Bartle =

English cricketer (born 1971)

Personal information
- Full name: Steven Bartle
- Born: 5 September 1971 (age 55); Shipley, Yorkshire, England
- Batting: Left-handed
- Bowling: Right-arm medium

Domestic team information
- Years: Team
- 1995: Leicestershire

Career statistics
| Competition | FC |
|---|---|
| Matches | 1 |
| Runs scored | 32 |
| Batting average | 32.00 |
| 100s/50s | –/– |
| Top score | 32 |
| Balls bowled | 12 |
| Wickets | – |
| Bowling average | – |
| 5 wickets in innings | – |
| 10 wickets in match | – |
| Best bowling | – |
| Catches/stumpings | 1/– |
- Source: Cricinfo, 8 May 2010

Steven Bartle (born 5 September 1971 in Shipley, Yorkshire) is an English cricketer. Bartle was a left-handed batsman who bowled right-arm medium pace.

Bartle represented Leicestershire in a single first-class match in 1995 against Oxford University. Bartle scored 32 runs and bowled 2 expensive overs which cost 42.
