= Rupesh Amin =

English cricketer

Personal information
- Full name: Rupesh Mahesh Amin
- Born: 20 August 1977 (age 49); Clapham, London
- Batting: Right-handed
- Bowling: Slow left-arm orthodox

Domestic team information
- Years: Team
- 1997–2002: Surrey
- 2003: Leicestershire

Career statistics
Competition	First-class	List A
Matches	20	4
Runs scored	65	0
Batting average	4.33	–
100s/50s	0/0	0/0
Top score	12	0*
Balls bowled	3,526	84
Wickets	35	2
Bowling average	48.82	48.50
5 wickets in innings	0	0
10 wickets in match	0	0
Best bowling	4/87	2/43
Catches/stumpings	6/–	1/–
- Source: CricketArchive, 9 August 2008

Rupesh Mahesh Amin (born 20 August 1977) is an English first-class cricketer and List A cricketer who played First-class games for Surrey County Cricket Club and Leicestershire County Cricket Club. He played all his List A games for Surrey. His highest score in First-class cricket of 12 came when playing for Surrey in the match against Leicestershire. His best bowling of 4/87 came when playing for Surrey in the match against Somerset County Cricket Club.

His Highest score in List A cricket of 0* came when playing for Surrey against Northamptonshire County Cricket Club.

He also played a total of 63 games for Surrey and Leicestershire second XI. and 39 Second XI cup games for surrey and Leicestershire second XI.
