= Frederick Hassall =

English cricketer

Personal information
- Full name: Frederick Handel Hassall
- Born: 11 August 1864; Nantwich, Cheshire, England
- Died: 14 February 1945 (aged 80); Leicester, Leicestershire, England
- Batting: Right-handed
- Bowling: Right-arm medium

Domestic team information
- Years: Team
- 1898–1902: Staffordshire
- 1894: Leicestershire

Career statistics
Competition	First-class
Matches	4
Runs scored	57
Batting average	8.14
100s/50s	–/–
Top score	20
Balls bowled	15
Wickets	–
Bowling average	–
5 wickets in innings	–
10 wickets in match	–
Best bowling	–
Catches/stumpings	1/–
- Source: Cricinfo, 23 March 2014

Frederick Handel Hassall (11 August 1864 – 14 February 1945) was an English cricketer active from 1894 to 1902 who played first-class cricket for Leicestershire and minor counties cricket for Staffordshire. He was born in Nantwich and died in Leicester.

A right-handed batsman and bowled right-arm medium pace bowler, Hassall played in four first-class matches for Leicestershire in 1894, including their maiden first-class fixture against Essex at Leyton. He scored 57 runs with a highest score of 20. He played minor counties cricket for Staffordshire from 1898 to 1902, making 21 appearances.
