= George Knew Sr =

English cricketer

Personal information
- Full name: George Frank Knew
- Born: 13 October 1920; Wigston, Leicestershire, England
- Died: 17 February 1995 (aged 74); Leicester, Leicestershire, England
- Batting: Right-handed
- Bowling: Unknown
- Relatives: George Knew junior (son)

Domestic team information
- Years: Team
- 1939: Leicestershire

Career statistics
Competition	First-class
Matches	5
Runs scored	78
Batting average	9.75
100s/50s	–/–
Top score	42
Balls bowled	200
Wickets	1
Bowling average	100.00
5 wickets in innings	–
10 wickets in match	–
Best bowling	1/58
Catches/stumpings	2/–
- Source: Cricinfo, 30 October 2011

George Frank Knew (13 October 1920 – 17 February 1995) was an English cricketer. Knew was a right-handed batsman, though his bowling style is unknown. He was born at Wigston, Leicestershire.

Knew made his first-class cricket debut for Leicestershire against Oxford University in 1939. He made four further first-class appearances in the 1939 season, the last of which came against Sussex. In his five first-class matches, he scored 78 runs at an average of 9.75, with a high score of 42. He bowled 200 balls in first-class cricket, taking the wicket of Sussex batsman James Langridge.

His son, George Knew junior, also played first-class cricket for Leicestershire. Knew died at Leicester on 17 February 1995.
