= William Brown (cricketer, born 1888) =

English cricketer

William Brown (11 April 1888 – 3 September 1964) was an English cricketer active from 1910 to 1919 who played for Leicestershire. He was born in Old Woodhouse and died in Heywood. He appeared in 46 first-class matches as a lefthanded batsman who bowled left arm slow medium. He scored 347 runs with a highest score of 35 and took 114 wickets with a best performance of seven for 51.
