= Richard Hincks =

English cricketer

Richard Hinks
Personal information
- Full name: Richard Hincks
- Born: 30 March 1871; Leicester, Leicestershire, England
- Died: 1928; Calgary, Alberta, Canada

Domestic team information
- Years: Team
- 1895: Leicestershire

Career statistics
| Competition | First-class |
|---|---|
| Matches | 2 |
| Runs scored | 15 |
| Batting average | 3.75 |
| 100s/50s | 0/0 |
| Top score | 14 |
| Balls bowled | 36 |
| Wickets | 2 |
| Bowling average | 14.50 |
| 5 wickets in innings | 0 |
| 10 wickets in match | 0 |
| Best bowling | 1/3 |
| Catches/stumpings | 1/– |
- Source: Cricinfo, 20 June 2012

Richard Hincks (30 March 1871 – date of death 1928) was an English cricketer. Hincks' batting and bowling style is unknown. He was born at Leicester, Leicestershire.

Hincks made two first-class appearances for Leicestershire in the 1895 County Championship, against Derbyshire and Lancashire, with both matches played at Grace Road, Leicester. In his first match, Leicestershire on the toss and elected to field first. Derbyshire were then dismissed in their first-innings for 211, during which Hincks bowled six overs which cost 26 runs, and took the wicket of Walter Sugg. Responding in their first-innings, Leicestershire made 171 all out, with Hincks dismissed for a duck by George Walker. Derbyshire then made 275 all out in their second-innings, with Hincks dismissing George Porter, who was the last man out. This left Leicestershire with a target of 316 for victory. However, they were dismissed for just 188 in their second-innings chase, with Hincks himself dismissed for 14 runs by Sugg. In his second match, Lancashire won the toss and elected to bat first, making 250 all out. In response, Leicestershire were dismissed in their first-innings for just 82, with Hincks contributing a single run to the total, before being dismissed by Johnny Briggs. Leicestershire were forced to follow-on and fared little better, this time making just 68 all out, with Hincks dismissed for a duck by Briggs. Lancashire won by an innings and 100 runs.
