= William Tomlin =

English cricketer

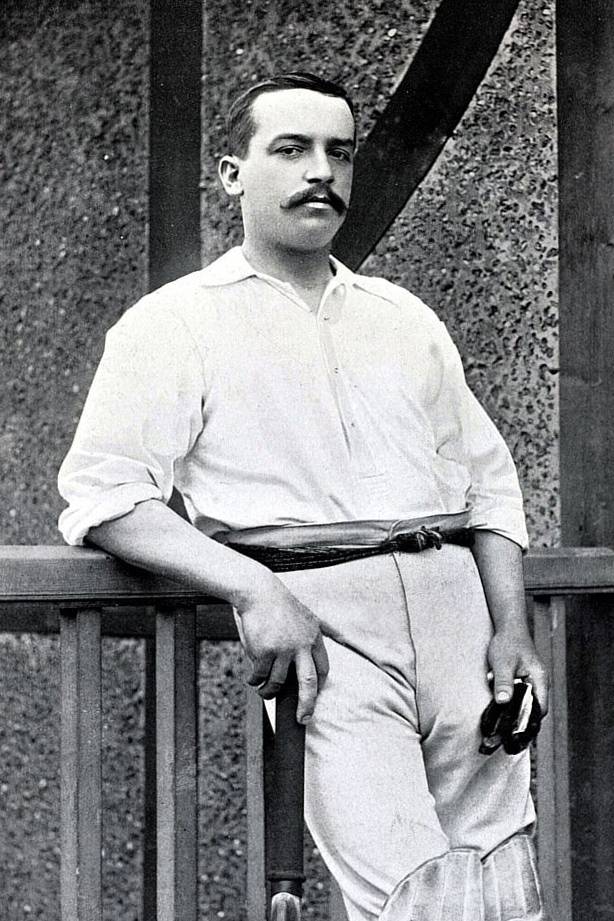
- Tomlin pictured during the 1890s

Personal information
- Born: 15 September 1866; Broughton Astley, Leicestershire, England
- Died: 11 May 1910 (aged 43); Leicester, England
- Batting: Right-handed
- Bowling: Right-arm medium

Domestic team information
- Years: Team
- 1894–1899: Leicestershire

Career statistics
Competition	First-class
Matches	68
Runs scored	2,353
Batting average	20.28
100s/50s	4/7
Top score	140
Balls bowled	575
Wickets	8
Bowling average	43.25
5 wickets in innings	0
10 wickets in match	0
Best bowling	3/49
Catches/stumpings	30/–
- Source: ESPNCricinfo, 15 October 2012

William Tomlin (15 September 1866 – 11 May 1910) was an English cricketer who played first-class cricket for Leicestershire from 1894 to 1899 and as a professional in the Lancashire League.

== Cricket career ==
Tomlin made his first-class debut against Essex in May 1894. The right handed batsman highest score of 140 was scored in May 1894 in a match against Marylebone Cricket Club (MCC). His right-arm medium pace claimed eight wickets at an average of 43.25.

In April 1892, Tomlin made his first appearance in the Lancashire League as a professional for Accrington. He went on to play in 16 matches and a further five for Colne.
