= Raymond Smith (English cricketer) =

English cricketer

Personal information
- Full name: Raymond Charles Smith
- Born: 3 August 1935; Duddington, Northamptonshire, England
- Died: 12 December 2001 (aged 66); St Lucia
- Batting: Right-handed
- Bowling: Left-arm orthodox spin
- Role: Bowler

Domestic team information
- Years: Team
- 1956–1964: Leicestershire

Career statistics
Competition	First-class
Matches	104
Runs scored	1,115
Batting average	9.36
100s/50s	0/0
Top score	36
Balls bowled	13,045
Wickets	203
Bowling average	27.16
5 wickets in innings	11
10 wickets in match	1
Best bowling	7/54
Catches/stumpings	28/–
- Source: CricketArchive, 15 October 2024

Raymond Charles Smith (3 August 1935 – 12 December 2001) was an English cricketer active who played for Leicestershire from 1956 to 1964. He was born in Duddington and died in St Lucia. He appeared in 104 first-class matches as a righthanded batsman who bowled slow left arm orthodox spin. He scored 1,115 runs with a highest score of 36 and took 203 wickets with a best performance of seven for 54.
