= Peter Hepworth =

English cricketer (born 1967)

Peter Nash Hepworth is a first-class cricketer. Born in Ackworth, Yorkshire in 1967 he played for Leicestershire from 1988 to 1994 as a right-handed batsman and occasional off spin bowler. He scored 2113 first-class runs in 59 first-class games, with a best of 129 among his 3 centuries, and took 30 wickets. He played 38 List A one-day matches, scoring 7 half centuries and taking 25 wickets. He was also the first team coach for the French national team around the 1999 era with ex Lancashire player, Jack Simmons
