= Alexander Dixon =

English cricketer

Alexander Willoughby Dixon (4 August 1876 – 1 March 1953) was an English cricketer active from 1900 to 1910 who played for Leicestershire. He was born in Liverpool and died in Houghton-on-the-Hill. He appeared in five first-class matches as a lefthanded batsman who bowled slow left arm orthodox spin. He scored 36 runs with a highest score of 18 and took five wickets with a best performance of two for 79.
