= Kenneth Peake =

English cricketer

Personal information
- Full name: Kenneth George Peake
- Born: 24 July 1920; Leicester, Leicestershire, England
- Died: 26 November 2011 (aged 91); Leicester, Leicestershire, England
- Batting: Right-handed
- Bowling: Right-arm fast-medium

Domestic team information
- Years: Team
- 1946: Leicestershire

Career statistics
Competition	First-class
Matches	1
Runs scored	2
Batting average	2.00
100s/50s	0/0
Top score	1*
Balls bowled	72
Wickets	0
Bowling average	–
5 wickets in innings	0
10 wickets in match	0
Best bowling	–
Catches/stumpings	0/–
- Source: Cricinfo, 14 February 2013

Kenneth George Peake (24 July 1920 – 26 November 2011) was an English cricketer. Peake was a right-handed batsman who bowled right-arm fast-medium. He was born at Leicester, Leicestershire.

Peake made a single first-class appearance for Leicestershire against Gloucestershire at Grace Road in the 1946 County Championship. Leicestershire won the toss and batted first, with Peake ending their innings of 211 all out unbeaten on 1. He bowled twelve wicketless overs in Gloucestershire's first-innings of 348 all out, conceding 52 runs. In Leicestershire's second-innings of 360 all out, he was dismissed for a single run by Tom Goddard. He did not bowl in Gloucestershire's second-innings, in which they reached their target with four wickets in hand. This was his only major appearance for the county.

He died in Leicester on 26 November 2011 aged 91.
