= William Hurd =

English cricketer

Personal information
- Full name: William Sydney Hurd
- Born: 10 September 1908; Ashby-de-la-Zouch, Leicestershire, England
- Died: May 1992 (aged 83); Abingdon, Oxfordshire, England
- Batting: Unknown
- Bowling: Unknown

Domestic team information
- Years: Team
- 1932–1934: Leicestershire

Career statistics
Competition	First-class
Matches	3
Runs scored	7
Batting average	1.75
100s/50s	–/–
Top score	5
Balls bowled	52
Wickets	–
Bowling average	–
5 wickets in innings	–
10 wickets in match	–
Best bowling	–
Catches/stumpings	–/–
- Source: Cricinfo, 24 January 2013

William Sydney Hurd (10 September 1908 – May 1992) was an English cricketer. Hurd's batting and bowling styles are unknown. He was born at Ashby-de-la-Zouch, Leicestershire.

Hurd made his first-class debut for Leicestershire against Kent in the 1932 County Championship. He made two further first-class appearances for the county, against Oxford University in 1932 and Worcestershire in the 1934 County Championship. He scored just 7 runs in his three matches, at an average of 1.75, with a high score of 5.

He died at Abingdon, Oxfordshire, in May 1992.
