= Joseph Toon =

English cricketer

Personal information
- Full name: Joseph Toon
- Born: 5 September 1879; Ratby, Leicestershire, England
- Died: 7 March 1950 (aged 70); Braunstone, Leicestershire, England
- Batting: Right-handed
- Bowling: Right-arm medium

Domestic team information
- Years: Team
- 1902–1909: Leicestershire

Career statistics
| Competition | First-class |
|---|---|
| Matches | 10 |
| Runs scored | 159 |
| Batting average | 10.60 |
| 100s/50s | –/– |
| Top score | 39 |
| Balls bowled | 743 |
| Wickets | 10 |
| Bowling average | 47.70 |
| 5 wickets in innings | – |
| 10 wickets in match | – |
| Best bowling | 4/114 |
| Catches/stumpings | 6/– |
- Source: Cricinfo, 16 January 2013

Joseph Toon (5 June 1879 – 7 March 1950) was an English cricketer. Toon was a right-handed batsman who bowled right-arm medium pace. He was born at Ratby, Leicestershire.

Toon made his first-class debut for Leicestershire against Derbyshire at Queen's Park, Chesterfield in the 1902 County Championship. He made nine further first-class appearances for the county, the last of which came against Derbyshire at Aylestone Road, Leicester in the 1909 County Championship. In his ten matches, he scored a total of 159 runs at an average of 10.60, with a high score of 39. With the ball, he took 10 wickets at a bowling average of 47.70, with best figures of 4/114.

He died at Braunstone, Leicestershire on 7 March 1950.
