= Edwin Wood (cricketer) =

English cricketer

Edwin James Wood (born 25 November 1868) was an English cricketer. He was a wicket-keeper who played for Leicestershire. He was born in Wymeswold.

Wood's only first-class appearance came during the 1907 season, against Surrey. He was described in a local Leicester newspaper as "a Melton player". From the tailend, he scored a single run in the first innings in which he batted and a duck in the second innings; he took two catches and made one stumping, though he also dropped Ernie Hayes in Surrey's first innings when Hayes had made 18, and he went on to make 157, the biggest innings of the match.
