= Charles Wooler =

Zimbabwean cricketer

Personal information
- Full name: Charles Robert Dudley Wooler
- Born: 30 June 1930; Bulawayo, Southern Rhodesia
- Died: 26 April 2017 (aged 86)
- Batting: Right-handed
- Bowling: Right-arm fast-medium
- Role: Bowler

Domestic team information
- Years: Team
- 1949–1951: Leicestershire
- 1951–1956: Rhodesia

Career statistics
Competition	First-class
Matches	60
Runs scored	832
Batting average	10.80
100s/50s	0/0
Top score	49*
Balls bowled	8,732
Wickets	130
Bowling average	31.00
5 wickets in innings	3
10 wickets in match	0
Best bowling	5/47
Catches/stumpings	16/–
- Source: CricketArchive, 15 August 2022

Charles Robert Dudley Wooler (30 June 1930 – 26 April 2017) was a first-class cricketer who played for Leicestershire County Cricket Club in England and the Rhodesia cricket team which competed in the Currie Cup.

Wooler born in Bulawayo, Southern Rhodesia. He was a right-arm fast-medium pace bowler and started his first-class career at Leicestershire. After making his debut in a non-championship match against Northamptonshire in 1949, he earned a regular spot in the team for the 1950 County Championship season. He finished the summer with 54 wickets at 31.31. His average would have been better had he not bowled in a match against the touring West Indians, who amassed 2/682 declared in their first innings. Frank Worrell and Everton Weekes both scored double hundreds while teammate Roy Marshall fell for 188. Wooler took 0/103 from his 28 overs.

He took exactly 50 wickets the following summer, at a slightly better average of 28.20. His 100th first-class wicket was that of Kent all-rounder Alan Shirreff. When the summer ended, Wooler traveled to Rhodesia and represented their team in the 1951/52 Currie Cup. He managed 23 wickets at 32.34 in first-class matches for Rhodesia, with perhaps the biggest of those scalps being his last, Denis Compton of the Marylebone Cricket Club.
