= George Rudd (cricketer, born 1866) =

English cricketer

George Edward Rudd (14 January 1866 – 16 September 1921) was an English cricketer active from 1894 to 1901 who played for Leicestershire. He was born in York and died in Leicester. He appeared in 22 first-class matches as a righthanded batsman who bowled slow left-arm orthodox spin. He scored 379 runs with a highest score of 47 and took twelve wickets with a best performance of five for 118.
