= Walter Beisiegel =

English cricketer (1907–1973)

Personal information
- Full name: Walter Karl Beisiegel
- Born: 13 July 1907; Uppingham, Rutland, England
- Died: 8 January 1973 (aged 65); RAF Halton, Buckinghamshire
- Batting: Right-handed
- Role: Batsman

Domestic team information
- Years: Team
- 1928–31: Royal Air Force
- 1934: Leicestershire
- First-class debut: 13 June 1928 Royal Air Force v The Army
- Last First-class: 31 August 1934 Leicestershire v Derbyshire

Career statistics
Competition	First-class
Matches	15
Runs scored	357
Batting average	16.22
100s/50s	–/2
Top score	54
Catches/stumpings	9/–
- Source: CricketArchive, 2 July 2013

Air Commodore Walter Karl Beisiegel, OBE (13 July 1907 – 8 January 1973) was an English career Royal Air Force officer who played first-class cricket for the Royal Air Force cricket team and also for Leicestershire. He was born at Uppingham, Rutland and died in the RAF hospital at RAF Halton, Buckinghamshire.

== Sporting career ==
Beisiegel was educated at Uppingham School, where his batting at cricket won praise from Harry Altham in the annual review of schools cricket in Wisden Cricketers' Almanack in 1926. Altham wrote that Beisiegel "stood head and shoulders over his colleagues" and his innings of 126 not out for Uppingham against Rugby School "was a fine wind-up to his school career".

For a period of five years between 1927 and 1932, inter-services cricket matches between the different branches of the UK armed forces – the Army, the Royal Navy and the Royal Air Force – were rated as first-class. Beisiegel played in five of these matches for the RAF team between 1928 and 1931 as a middle-order batsman. In his first match, against The Army cricket team in 1928, he scored 54 in his only innings of the match, and this was to be the highest score of his first-class career. A year later, in the same fixture, he top-scored for the RAF with 53. Though Beisiegel continued to play in these inter-services matches through to 1938, none of his games were first-class after 1931, and these were the only first-class scores he made of more than 50.

Three years after his last first-class game for the Royal Air Force team, Beisiegel played 10 matches for Leicestershire in the 1934 season as a middle-order batsman. He was not particularly successful, scoring 185 runs at an average of just 12.33 and with a highest score of only 33. But when the Leicestershire captain Arthur Hazlerigg was injured late in the season, it fell to Beisiegel as an amateur player to take over the captaincy, and in his first game as captain he led the team to its first victory over Yorkshire since 1911. The Times report said that it was "the most sensational victory of the season": Yorkshire had declared their first innings 102 ahead with only five wickets down but, set 149 to win, were all out for 90. Two weeks later there was a second victory under Beisiegel's leadership against a team considered greatly superior to Leicestershire when Nottinghamshire were beaten by an innings and 106 runs inside two days at Trent Bridge. The end of the season, however, marked the end of Beisiegel's first-class cricket career as he resumed his RAF duties; he was, however, awarded an honorary county cap in recognition of his captaincy successes.

== Military career ==
From school, Beisiegel went as a cadet to the Royal Air Force College Cranwell, where he graduated as a pilot officer in December 1927. He was promoted from flying officer to flight lieutenant in 1933. This was followed by promotion to squadron leader in 1937. From the outbreak of the Second World War he was, from September 1939 to May 1940, in charge of No. 616 Squadron RAF, a unit that was equipped with the Mark I Spitfire. During his command the squadron was based at RAF Leconfield until deployed south in May 1940. In 1942, he was temporarily promoted from wing commander to group captain under the heading of "General Duties". He remained in the RAF after the Second World War and was officially promoted to group captain in 1947. In 1950, he was appointed an Officer of the Order of the British Empire in the King's Birthday Honours. He retired from the RAF with a promotion to the rank of air commodore in 1956.
