= Mat Chapman =

English cricketer

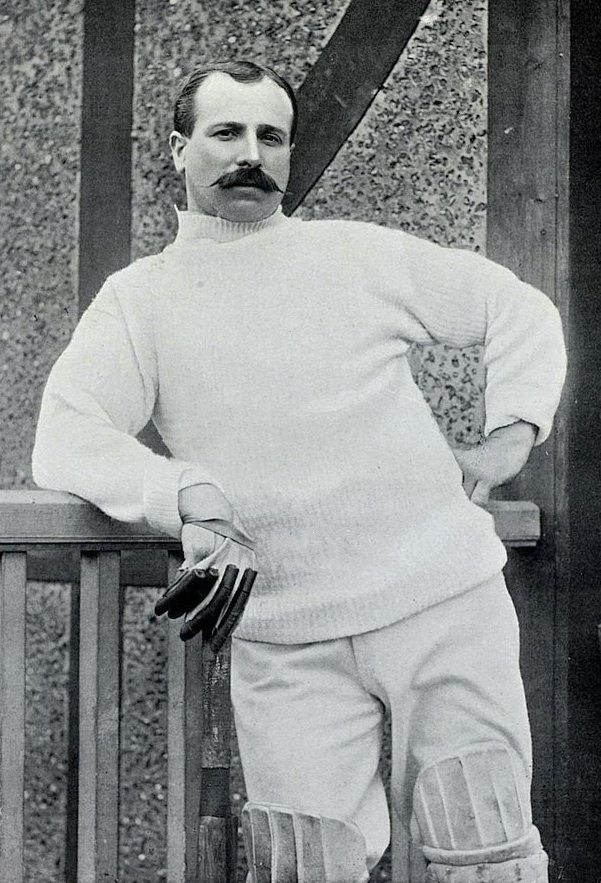

Personal information
- Full name: Mat Chapman
- Born: 13 April 1865; Arnesby, Leicestershire, England
- Died: 28 November 1909 (aged 44); Narborough, Leicestershire, England
- Batting: Right-handed
- Bowling: Right-arm medium

Domestic team information
- Years: Team
- 1890–1895: Leicestershire

Career statistics
Competition	First-class
Matches	28
Runs scored	633
Batting average	13.18
100s/50s	0/2
Top score	56
Balls bowled	25
Wickets	0
Bowling average	–
5 wickets in innings	–
10 wickets in match	–
Best bowling	–
Catches/stumpings	21/2

Mat Chapman (13 April 1865 – 28 November 1909) was an English cricketer active from 1890 to 1895 who played over 50 times for Leicestershire. As Leicestershire was a second-class county until 1894, his first-class debut was made for Liverpool and District in 1893. He appeared in 28 first-class matches as a right-handed batsman who sometimes kept wicket. He scored 633 first-class runs with a highest score of 56 and completed 21 catches with two stumpings.

In April 1882 when he was 17 years old Chapman enlisted in the Leicestershire Regiment of the Militia or Army Reserve, he was described as a Labourer.
