= Francis Prentice =

English cricketer (1912–1978)

Frank Prentice
Personal information
- Full name: Francis Thomas Prentice
- Born: 22 April 1912; Knaresborough, Yorkshire, England
- Died: 10 July 1978 (aged 66); Headingley, Leeds, Yorkshire
- Batting: Right-handed
- Bowling: Right-arm off-breaks
- Role: Batsman

Domestic team information
- Years: Team
- 1934–51: Leicestershire
- First-class debut: 9 June 1934 Leicestershire v Oxford University
- Last First-class: 1 June 1951 Leicestershire v Worcestershire

Career statistics
Competition	First-class
Matches	241
Runs scored	10997
Batting average	27.70
100s/50s	17/48
Top score	191
Balls bowled	11929
Wickets	117
Bowling average	49.97
5 wickets in innings	2
10 wickets in match	–
Best bowling	5/46
Catches/stumpings	75/–
- Source: CricketArchive, 8 July 2013

Francis Thomas Prentice (22 April 1912 – 10 July 1978) was an English first-class cricketer who played for Leicestershire between 1934 and 1951. He was born at Knaresborough, Yorkshire and died at Leeds, also in Yorkshire.

Prentice was a right-handed batsman often used as an opener and a right-arm off-break bowler, used irregularly and often rather expensively. He played a few matches for Yorkshire's second eleven in the Minor Counties Championship in 1931. But with competition for places in Yorkshire's first eleven very stiff, he left to join Leicestershire, where he was not qualified for County Championship games until 1935. From then on until the end of the 1949 season he was a regular in the Leicestershire first team.

== Pre-war cricket ==
Not yet qualified, Prentice had made his first-class debut in Leicestershire's match against Oxford University in 1934, batting at No 7 in the first innings, when he made 39, but opening in the second innings. He was picked for the first game of the 1935 season and kept his place through what Wisden Cricketers' Almanack called "the most successful season in the history of the club". Prentice himself had a modest record, with 713 runs at an average of 16.20, and only two scores of more than 50. But, Wisden noted, "possessed of a solid defence, (he) often played an invaluable innings in a crisis". His record improved to 989 runs and an average of 24.12 in 1936, but Wisden was less impressed: "Prentice showed extremely sound defence, but did not appear to have many strokes at his command," it wrote, noting also that, with the likely unavailability of Alan Shipman in 1937, "efforts were made to convert Prentice into an opening batsman". Prentice was awarded his county cap in 1936.

The move to open the innings was an immediate success: in 1937, Prentice scored 1506 runs at an average of 32.73 and of his opening partnership with Les Berry Wisden wrote that "with the exception perhaps of Yorkshire and Sussex no other county possessed such consistent opening batsmen". It added: "Prentice confirmed all the high opinions formed of him. Using more strokes than previously, he also retained his solid defence and proved an extremely difficult batsman to dislodge." In the first match of the season, Prentice made his first first-class century, an innings of 163 against Hampshire. He followed that with 127 in the second game, against Northamptonshire, and in both games he shared a century opening partnership with Berry. He made four centuries in the season. In addition, because of a shortage of spin bowlers, he bowled more than 400 overs of off-spin, and though his 24 wickets cost more than 55 runs apiece, against Lancashire he took five wickets for 82 runs, his first five-wicket return, though the Lancastrians totalled 469 in their only innings of the match. He was less prolific in both 1938 and 1939, failing to score 1000 runs in either season and missing a few matches through injury in each of them.

== Post-war cricket ==
Prentice returned to Leicestershire after the Second World War, although he was thereafter handicapped to a degree by a bad fracture of the wrist he had sustained on war service. In a rather more mobile batting order, with competition for the opening places, Prentice often batted at No 3 in the first four post-war seasons, but passed 1000 runs in each of them. He bowled less after the war, and scarcely at all after 1947, but in 1946, despite the presence in the Leicestershire attack of Vic Jackson and Jack Walsh, he took five Gloucestershire wickets for 46 runs, and these were the best figures of his career. The 1948 and 1949 seasons were the best of his career as a batsman. In 1948, he scored 1328 runs at an average of 36.88 and headed the Leicestershire batting averages for the first and only time. His figures in 1949 were even more impressive – 1742 runs and an average of 38.71 – though he was beaten in the county's averages by Berry, who had been out of form in 1948. The 1949 record included five centuries before the end of June and the five included an innings of 191 against Nottinghamshire which was the highest of his career.

Prentice was granted a testimonial in 1950, but had a poor season with bat, losing his place in the team mid-season and regaining it only at the end of the year. At the end of the 1950 season, he retired from full-time cricket to go into business; he appeared in just four matches in 1951, playing as an amateur, and those were the last games of his career.
