= Eddie Dawson =

English cricketer

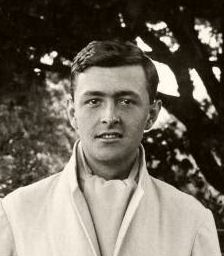

Personal information
- Full name: Edward William Dawson
- Born: 13 February 1904; Paddington, London, England
- Died: 4 June 1979 (aged 75); Idmiston, Wiltshire, England
- Batting: Right-handed

International information
- National side: England (1928–1930)
- Test debut (cap 233): 4 February 1928 v South Africa
- Last Test: 21 February 1930 v New Zealand

Domestic team information
- Years: Team
- 1922–1934: Leicestershire

Career statistics
Competition	Test	First-class
Matches	5	282
Runs scored	175	12,598
Batting average	19.44	27.09
100s/50s	0/1	14/63
Top score	55	146
Balls bowled	–	52
Wickets	–	0
Bowling average	–	–
5 wickets in innings	–	–
10 wickets in match	–	–
Best bowling	–	–
Catches/stumpings	0/–	110/–
- Source: CricInfo, 24 October 2021

Edward William Dawson (13 February 1904 – 4 June 1979) was an English cricketer who played in five Test matches between 1928 and 1930.

A batsman whose studious technique made use of his talent, Dawson excelled as a schoolboy for Eton College, scoring 159 in the traditional fixture against Harrow. He went up to Magdalene College, Cambridge, and earned his blue as a freshman, captaining the university in 1927.

Dawson played his county cricket for Leicestershire, captaining the county for four seasons: 1928, 1929, 1931 and 1933. He toured with England to South Africa in 1927–28 and New Zealand in 1929–30. He made 55 in his last Test, at Auckland, opening the innings with Ted Bowley. He scored 12,598 first-class runs with 14 centuries, the highest being a knock of 146 against Gloucestershire. His swansong was a chanceless 91 against the Australians in 1934.

As a member of the Coldstream Guards during World War II, Dawson's duties included guarding Rudolf Hess in Sussex. In his later years he was a creative director of the Outward Bound movement.
