= George Rudd (cricketer, born 1894) =

English cricketer

George Boyd Franklin Rudd (3 July 1894 – 4 February 1957) was an English cricketer active from 1913 to 1932 who played for Leicestershire. He was born and died in Leicester. He appeared in 88 first-class matches as a righthanded batsman who bowled right arm medium pace. He scored 2,916 runs with a highest score of 114 and took 18 wickets with a best performance of three for 38.
