= Paul Griffiths (cricketer, born 1975) =

English cricketer (born 1975)

Paul Griffiths (born 14 September 1975 in Wolverhampton) is an English former cricketer who was active from 2000 to 2001 and played for Leicestershire. He appeared in two first-class matches as a righthanded batsman who bowled right arm medium fast. He scored five runs with a highest score of 4* and took three wickets with a best performance of two for 51.
