= William Marlow (cricketer) =

English cricketer

William Henry Marlow (13 February 1900 – 16 December 1975) was an English cricketer active from 1931 to 1936 who played for Leicestershire. He was born in Wigston and died in Leicester. He appeared in 109 first-class matches as a lefthanded batsman who bowled left arm medium pace. He scored 1,117 runs with a highest score of 64 and took 261 wickets with a best performance of seven for 90.
