= 1925 County Championship =

English cricket tournament

- Cricket format: First-class cricket
- Tournament format: League system
- Champions: Yorkshire (14th title)
- Participants: 17

The 1925 County Championship was the 32nd officially organised running of the County Championship. Yorkshire County Cricket Club won the championship title for the fourth successive year.

Final placings were still decided by calculating the percentage of points gained against possible points available. The minimum number of matches required to qualify for the championship was increased to twelve home and away in a non-test match season.

== Table ==
- Five points were awarded for a win.
- Three points were awarded for "winning" the first innings of a drawn match.
- Two points were awarded for "tying" the first innings of a drawn match.
- One point was awarded for "losing" the first innings of a drawn match.
- Final placings were decided by calculating the percentage of possible points.

County Championship table
Team	Pld	W	L	DWF	DLF	NR	Pts	%PC
Yorkshire	32	21	0	3	3	5	117	86.66
Surrey	26	14	2	4	2	4	84	76.36
Lancashire	32	19	4	7	1	1	117	75.36
Nottinghamshire	26	15	3	1	6	1	84	67.20
Kent	28	15	7	1	1	4	79	65.83
Middlesex	24	12	3	2	5	2	71	64.54
Essex	28	9	7	5	5	2	65	50.00
Warwickshire	26	8	11	4	2	1	54	43.20
Hampshire	28	6	11	6	0	5	48	41.73
Gloucestershire	28	9	13	3	3	0	57	40.71
Northamptonshire	24	9	12	0	3	0	48	40.00
Leicestershire	26	7	13	3	2	1	46	36.80
Sussex	30	9	16	1	3	1	51	35.17
Derbyshire	24	5	12	2	4	1	35	30.43
Somerset	26	3	15	4	2	2	29	24.16
Worcestershire	26	5	18	0	3	0	28	21.53
Glamorgan	26	1	20	1	2	2	10	8.33
