= 1911 County Championship =

English cricket tournament

- Cricket format: First-class cricket (3 days)
- Tournament format: League system
- Champions: Warwickshire (1st title)
- Participants: 16
- Matches: 180
- Most runs: Tom Hayward (1,963 for Surrey)
- Most wickets: Harry Dean (175 for Lancashire)

The 1911 County Championship was the twenty-second officially organised running of the County Championship, and ran from 4 May to 5 September 1911. Warwickshire County Cricket Club won their first championship title. Somerset finished bottom of the table, winning only one match all season. Tom Hayward topping the batting charts, scoring 1,963 runs for Surrey at an average of 50.33, though C. B. Fry scored his 1,299 runs at a far superior average of 76.41. Lancashire's Harry Dean took the most wickets, accumulating 175 at an average of 17.52.

The championship adopted a new method of scoring points, which was proposed by Somerset. Previously the only way to score points was by winning a match, but the new method introduced points for draws. A winning team scored five points, a team which drew a match, but scored more runs in the first innings scored three points, and a team which drew a match, but scored less runs in the first innings scored one point. In his editorial in the Wisden Cricketers' Almanack, Sydney Pardon notes that had any of the previous scoring methods been used, Kent would have won the championship, rather than Warwickshire. In their book A History of Cricket, Harry Altham and E. W. Swanton describe Kent as being "possibly a finer all-round team" than Warwickshire, but heap praise on Warwickshire's batting, and their young captain, Frank Foster.

Pardon was complimentary of the cricket played during the season, and described that cricket "generally flourished". However, he also observed that a number of counties were in financially difficulty, an issue that Lord Cobham attributed partially to the wages of professional players.

== Table ==
- Five points were awarded for a win.
- Three points were awarded for "winning" the first innings of a drawn match.
- One point was awarded for "losing" the first innings of a drawn match.
- Matches which ended without both teams completing a first innings were added to the "No result" column. Teams won no points for these draws, but these matches were not included in the calculation of possible points.
- Final placings were decided by calculating the percentage of possible points.

County Championship table
	County	Played	Won	Lost	First Innings			Points		%
	County	Played	Won	Lost	Won	Lost	No result	Poss	Obtd	%
1	Warwickshire	20	13	4	3	0	0	100	74	74.00
2	Kent	26	17	4	3	2	0	130	96	73.84
3	Middlesex	22	14	5	3	0	0	110	79	71.81
4	Lancashire	30	15	7	5	3	0	150	93	62.00
5	Surrey	30	15	7	4	4	0	150	91	60.66
6	Essex	18	8	5	4	1	0	90	53	58.88
7	Yorkshire	28	14	8	1	4	1	135	77	57.03
8	Nottinghamshire	20	9	5	3	3	0	100	57	57.00
9	Worcestershire	24	12	11	0	1	0	120	61	50.83
10	Northamptonshire	18	8	9	0	0	1	85	40	47.05
11	Hampshire	24	7	10	4	3	0	120	50	41.66
12	Gloucestershire	20	5	12	0	3	0	100	38	38.00
13	Sussex	24	4	16	2	2	0	120	28	23.33
14	Derbyshire	18	2	13	0	3	0	90	13	14.44
15	Leicestershire	22	1	16	2	3	0	110	14	12.72
16	Somerset	16	1	13	0	2	0	80	7	8.75

== Records ==
Most runs
Aggregate	Average	Player	County
1,963	50.33	Tom Hayward	Surrey
1,959	41.68	Jack Sharp	Lancashire
1,744	39.63	David Denton	Yorkshire
1,706	58.82	Phil Mead	Hampshire
1,700	56.66	Reggie Spooner	Lancashire

Most wickets
Aggregate	Average	Player	County
175	17.52	Harry Dean	Lancashire
152	19.25	Razor Smith	Surrey
125	19.46	Charlie Blythe	Kent
123	21.83	Tom Rushby	Surrey
122	19.48	Frank Field	Warwickshire
