= Maurice Hallam =

English cricketer (1931–2000)

Personal information
- Full name: Maurice Raymond Hallam
- Born: 10 September 1931; Leicester, Leicestershire, England
- Died: 1 January 2000 (aged 68); Leicester, Leicestershire
- Batting: Right-handed

Domestic team information
- Years: Team
- 1950–1970: Leicestershire

Career statistics
Competition	First-class	List A
Matches	504	17
Runs scored	24,488	335
Batting average	28.84	19.70
100s/50s	32/122	1/0
Top score	210*	106
Balls bowled	204	0
Wickets	4	–
Bowling average	35.50	–
5 wickets in innings	0	–
10 wickets in match	0	–
Best bowling	1/12	–
Catches/stumpings	452/–	5/–
- Source: CricketArchive, 18 September 2013

Maurice Raymond Hallam (10 September 1931 – 1 January 2000) was an English first-class cricketer for Leicestershire. He was a right-handed opening batsman.

Hallam made his first-class debut for Leicestershire in 1950 and played his last game in 1970. He captained the county in 1963, 1964, 1965 and 1968.

== Records ==
- A good slips fielder, Hallam took 56 catches in 1961 which remains a record for most catches in a season for Leicestershire .
- He scored a century in each innings of a match on 3 occasions, the most ever for the county .
- He is one of only four Leicestershire batsmen to make more than 2000 runs in a season, scoring 2096 in 1961 .
- His 23662 runs is second only to Les Berry for most ever runs for Leicestershire.
