= Les Berry =

English cricketer (1906–1985)

Personal information
- Full name: George Leslie Berry
- Born: 28 May 1906; Dorking, Surrey, England
- Died: 5 February 1985 (aged 78); Great Glen, Leicestershire, England
- Batting: Right-handed

Domestic team information
- Years: Team
- 1924–1951: Leicestershire

Career statistics
Competition	First-class
Matches	609
Runs scored	30,225
Batting average	30.25
100s/50s	45/148
Top score	232
Balls bowled	764
Wickets	10
Bowling average	60.60
5 wickets in innings	0
10 wickets in match	0
Best bowling	1/1
Catches/stumpings	181/0
- Source: CricketArchive, 10 April 2023

George Leslie Berry (28 May 1906 – 5 February 1985) was a cricketer who played for Leicestershire and holds many of the county's first-class batting records.

A right-handed batsman who started his career in the middle order but became an opener, Berry, who had moved to Market Harborough at the age of eight, joined Leicestershire in the 1924 season, when he played in half the first-class matches but with little success. The following year, however, he made 1,071 runs at an average of 21 and appeared in virtually every match. He was then a regular member of the team until he retired, at the age of 45, at the end of the 1951 season.

As well as the 1,000 runs he scored in 1925, Berry passed the 1,000-run mark in every English first-class cricket season from 1928 to 1950, and his 2,446 runs at an average of more than 50 runs an innings in 1937 remains the Leicestershire record for a season. His first century, against Worcestershire at Ashby-de-la-Zouch in 1928, was a score of 207 at not much short of a run a minute, and by the time he retired he had added 44 others for Leicestershire: the total of 45 first-class centuries remains the county record. He also holds the county record for most first-class runs with 30,143, and his seven centuries in 1937 have been equalled for Leicestershire by Willie Watson and Brian Davison, but never beaten.

Berry was a record-holder in another respect as well: when cricket resumed after the Second World War, Leicestershire had no suitable amateur to captain the side, so Berry became the county captain. Though Ewart Astill had captained Leicestershire in a similar hiatus in 1935, Berry was the first professional captain for one of the English cricket counties who was more than a stopgap: he was reappointed for two further seasons, and in his final season as captain, 1948, he was joined as a professional county captain by Tom Dollery of Warwickshire.

Berry was perhaps unlucky not to be chosen for representative matches, but was not very successful in the few games he played for teams other than Leicestershire. He was considered a good fielder in general, often serving as an outfielder. He bowled rarely, taking only 10 wickets in his career. Away from cricket he played association football as a goalkeeper for Market Harborough, Sheffield Wednesday, Bristol Rovers, Swindon Town and Nuneaton Town. He made 34 senior appearances for Bristol Rovers between 1930 and 1931 and 22 for Swindon during the 1932–33 season.

After retiring from cricket, he became the cricket coach at Uppingham School where he worked until 1979, and was the director of a sports shop in Leicester. Although christened George Leslie, for most of his cricket career he was known as L. G. Berry and his Wisden obituary refers to him by this name. He died at Great Glen, Leicestershire in 1985, aged 78.
