= Willie Watson (English cricketer) =

English cricketer and footballer

- Willie Watson in 1951

Personal information
- Full name: Willie Watson
- Born: 7 March 1920; Bolton upon Dearne, Yorkshire, England
- Died: 24 April 2004 (aged 84); Johannesburg, South Africa
- Batting: Left-handed

International information
- National side: England
- Test debut: 7 June 1951 v South Africa
- Last Test: 14 March 1959 v New Zealand

Career statistics
Competition	Test	First-class
Matches	23	468
Runs scored	879	25,670
Batting average	25.85	39.86
100s/50s	2/3	55/132
Top score	116	257
Balls bowled	–	194
Wickets	–	0
Bowling average	–	–
5 wickets in innings	–	–
10 wickets in match	–	–
Best bowling	–	–
Catches/stumpings	8/–	295/–
- Source: CricInfo, 9 September 2022

Willie Watson (7 March 1920 – 24 April 2004) was an English cricketer, who played for Yorkshire, Leicestershire and England. He was a double international, as Watson was also a footballer who played for England's national team. He was the son of Billy Watson, and brother of Albert Watson, also footballers.

== Cricket career ==
Born in Bolton on Dearne, Yorkshire, England, Watson, a left-handed batsman, made his debut for Yorkshire in 1939, and was a regular in the side for a dozen years after World War II. He made his Test match debut against the South Africans in 1951, and did well. But at a time when England was rich in batting talent, Watson rarely commanded a regular place and his twenty three Test matches were spread across eight years. His most famous innings was one of 109, in almost six hours, which with Trevor Bailey contributing to a partnership of 163, enabled England to save the second Test at Lord's in 1953 against the Australians, when the game appeared to be lost.

Despite being a stylish left-hander, his Test career was a series of stops and starts. He even found himself dropped after his efforts at Lord's for the final Ashes series clinching victory. Nevertheless, he was one of the five Wisden Cricketers of the Year in 1954.

Watson toured in the West Indies in 1953–54, and scored his second Test century in Jamaica. His final Test appearance was in New Zealand in March 1959. Watson's highest first-class score was 257, for the Marylebone Cricket Club (MCC) against British Guiana at Georgetown.

Watson's cricket career received a late boost when, in 1958, he left Yorkshire and joined Leicestershire as assistant secretary and captain. A popular if quiet skipper, he temporarily regained his England place, and was also instrumental in a limited revival of the Leicestershire's fortunes. He played his last first-class match for Leicestershire in 1964.

He wrote his memoirs, Double International, in 1956.

Watson emigrated to South Africa in 1968, to coach the Wanderers. He died in Johannesburg in April 2004, at the age of 84.

== Football career ==
Willie Watson
Personal information
- Position: Midfielder

Senior career*
Years	Team	Apps	(Gls)
1938–1939	Huddersfield Town	11	(0)
1946–1954	Sunderland	211	(16)
1954–1956	Halifax Town	33	(1)
Total		255	(17)

International career
1949–1950	England	4	(0)

Managerial career
- 1954–1956: Halifax Town
- 1964–1966: Halifax Town
- 1966–1968: Bradford City
- * Club domestic league appearances and goals

As a footballer, Watson was a cultured wing-half for Huddersfield Town, Sunderland and Halifax Town. He made 211 league appearances for Sunderland, in his seven seasons at the club. He played for England four times, gaining his first cap in England's 9–2 victory over Northern Ireland in November 1949. He was a member of the squad for the 1950 FIFA World Cup, though he did not appear in any of the games in the tournament in Brazil. He had two spells in charge of Halifax, from 1954 to 1956 and later from 1964 to 1966, and also managed Bradford City from 1966 to 1968, where he laid the foundations of a promotion-winning team, but his biggest successes were in cricket.
