= George Bell =

George Bell may refer to:

== Law and politics ==
- George Joseph Bell (1770–1843), Scottish jurist and legal author
- George Alexander Bell (1856–1927), Canadian pioneer and Saskatchewan politician
- George Bell (Canadian politician) (1869–1940), politician in British Columbia
- George John Bell (1872–1944), Australian politician
- George Bell (trade unionist) (1878–1959), British trade union leader
- George E. Bell (1883–1970), Canadian politician
- George T. Bell (1913–1973), special assistant to United States President Richard Nixon
- George W. Bell, doctor and state legislator in Arkansas

== Military ==
- George Bell (British Army officer) (1794–1877), Irish general
- George Bell (brigadier general) (1828–1907), American Civil War brigadier general
- George H. Bell (1839–1917), American Civil War sailor and Medal of Honor recipient
- George Bell Jr. (1859–1926), United States Army major general
- George Gray Bell (1920–2000), Canadian soldier, civil servant, and academic

== Sports ==
- George Bell (pitcher) (1874–1941), American baseball player
- George Bell (footballer, born 1861) (1861–1959), English footballer
- George Bell (Australian footballer) (1912–1999), Australian rules footballer
- George Bell (basketball) (1957–2025), Harlem Globetrotter and tallest American man
- George Bell (outfielder) (born 1959), Dominican Republic baseball player
- George Bell (rugby union) (born 2002), New Zealand rugby union player
- George Bell (cricketer) (born 2002), English cricketer

== Others ==
- George Bell (editor) (1809–1899), New Zealand newspaper proprietor and editor
- George Bell (publisher) (1814–1890), British publisher, founder of George Bell & Sons
- George Bell (painter) (1878–1966), Australian painter
- George Bell (bishop) (1883–1958), Anglican bishop of Chichester
- Max Bell (George Maxwell Bell, 1912–1972), Canadian newspaper publisher and businessman
- George Irving Bell (1926–2000), American physicist, biologist and mountaineer
- George Bell (activist) (1761–1843), advocate and activist for African American education
- George Douglas Hutton Bell (1905–1993), English plant breeder
- "George Bell", pseudonym of George Roussos (1915–2000), American comic book artist

== See also ==
- George Bell & Sons, defunct London publishing house, operating 1836–1986
- George Ball (disambiguation)
