= General Bell (disambiguation) =

George Bell Jr. (1859–1926) was a United States Army major general during World War I. General Bell may also refer to:

- Burwell B. Bell III (born 1947), U.S. Army four-star general
- Chris Bell (British Army officer) (fl. 2000s–2020s), British Army major general
- Edward Wells Bell (c. 1789–1870), British Army general
- George Bell (brigadier general) (1828–1907), U.S. Army brigadier general in the American Civil War
- George Bell (British Army officer) (1794–1877), Irish general in the British Army
- George Gray Bell (1920–2000), Canadian Army brigadier general
- George Bell Jr. (1859–1926), U.S. Army major general
- J. Franklin Bell (1856–1919), U.S. Army major general
- James Martin Bell (1796–1849), Ohio Militia major general
- John Bell (British Army officer) (1782–1876), British Army general
- John Bell (Ohio politician) (1796–1869), Ohio Militia major general
- Sherman Bell (fl. 1900s–1910s), Adjutant General of the Colorado National Guard
- Tyree H. Bell (1815–1902), Confederate States Army brigadier general

== See also ==
- Attorney General Bell (disambiguation)
