= James B. Aleshire =

U.S. Army major general (1856–1925)

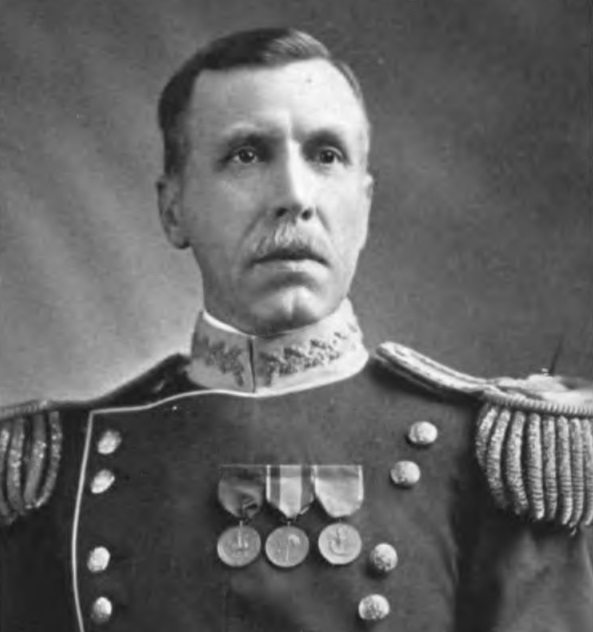
- From the November 1912 issue of National Waterways magazine
- Born: October 31, 1856; Gallipolis, Ohio, U.S.
- Died: June 1, 1925 (aged 68); Sheridan, Wyoming, U.S.
- Burial place: Arlington National Cemetery
- Spouse: Harriet A. Dana Aleshire (m. 1886–1925, his death)
- Military career
- Service: United States Army
- Service years: 1880–1916, 1917–1918
- Rank: Major General
- Unit: U.S. Army Quartermaster Corps
- Commands: Chief Quartermaster, First Army Corps; Chief Quartermaster, Department of Matanzas; Chief Quartermaster, Department of Santiago and Puerto Principe; Chief Quartermaster, China Relief Expedition; Army Transport Service; Manila Depot; Quartermaster General of the United States Army; Priority Committee, Council of National Defense
- Wars: American Indian Wars; Spanish–American War; China Relief Expedition; Philippine–American War; World War I

James B. Aleshire (October 31, 1856 – June 1, 1925) was a career officer in the United States Army. A 1880 graduate of the United States Military Academy (West Point), he served from 1880 to 1916, and attained the rank of major general. A veteran of the American Indian Wars, Spanish–American War, China Relief Expedition, and Philippine–American War, Aleshire was most notable for his service as Quartermaster General of the United States Army from 1907 to 1916, during which he was credited with combining the formerly separate Quartermaster, Subsistence and Pay Departments to create the consolidated U.S. Army Quartermaster Corps.

A native of Gallipolis, Ohio, Aleshire attended West Point from 1876 to 1880 and at graduation received his commission as a second lieutenant of Cavalry. Assigned initially to the 1st Cavalry Regiment, Aleshire served in the 1880s on scouting and frontier duty during the American Indian Wars. Beginning in the early 1890s, he was posted primarily to quartermaster assignments. During the Spanish–American War, China Relief Expedition, and Philippine–American War, he carried out chief quartermaster postings for several units and departments, and headed the Army Transport Service in the Philippines.

From July 1907 to September 1916, Aleshire was the Quartermaster General of the United States Army. When his first four-year term expired in 1912, he was reappointed, and he continued to serve until retiring for disability. In addition to creating the U.S. Army Quartermaster Corps by combining the Quartermaster, Subsistence and Pay Departments, Aleshire created efficiency and cost savings by creating five divisions within his headquarters to administer the Quartermaster Corps while decentralizing previously centralized day to day responsibilities to quartermaster officers at the department, division, and unit levels.

When he retired in September 1916, Aleshire requested to return to active duty if the United States became involved in World War I. He was recalled in June 1917 and appointed to the Council of National Defense, the U.S. government body that coordinated transportation, industrial, farm production, and financial support for the war effort. Aleshire was selected for the chairmanship of the council's Priority Committee, and he served until retiring again in July 1918. In retirement, Aleshire resided in Sheridan, Wyoming. He died in Sheridan on June 1, 1925, and was buried at Arlington National Cemetery.

== Early life ==
James Buchanan Aleshire was born in Gallipolis, Ohio on October 31, 1856, the youngest son of Reuben Aleshire and Margaret (Shepard) Aleshire. Reuben Aleshire operated a successful flour milling business, and two of James Aleshire's brothers served in the Union Army during the American Civil War. James Aleshire attended the schools of Gallipolis and Gallia Academy. In 1876, he received an appointment to the United States Military Academy from Congressman John L. Vance, who was his cousin. He graduated in June 1880 ranked 18th of 52 and received his commission as a second lieutenant in the Cavalry branch. Among his fellow classmates there at the academy were several men who would, like Aleshire himself, eventually attain the rank of brigadier general or higher in their military careers, such as George W. Goethals, William C. Rafferty, John L. Chamberlain, Charles J. Bailey, Frederick S. Strong, James B. Erwin, William S. Scott, and George Bell Jr., and Henry G. Sharpe.

== Start of career ==
After receiving his commission, Aleshire was assigned to the 1st Cavalry Regiment and he performed scouting and frontier duty at several posts in the western United States during the American Indian Wars. These included: Fort Bidwell, California from September 1880 to September 1881; Fort Huachuca, Arizona from September 1881 to April 1882; Fort Bidwell from April to May 1882; Fort Walla Walla, Washington from May 1882 to November 1882; Fort Bidwell from November 1882 to October 1883; and Fort Walla Walla from October 1883 to February 1884.

In December 1883 and January 1884, heavy snowfalls inundated the Ohio River Valley, which were followed by warm weather and heavy rain in February. Severe flooding of the Allegheny River and Ohio River in Pennsylvania, West Virginia, and Ohio resulted, and in the spring of 1884 Aleshire was among the troops dispatched to western Pennsylvania to assist in the distribution of emergency supplies to affected residents. In May and June 1884, Aleshire performed escort duty for recruits en route to their duty stations on the Pacific coast. He next served with his regiment at Fort Custer, Montana, where he remained through September 1889.

From September 1889 to August 1890, Aleshire served as secretary of the Infantry and Cavalry School at Fort Leavenworth, Kansas. In September 1890 he received promotion to first lieutenant, followed by assignment as quartermaster officer of the 1st Cavalry, first at Fort Custer, and later at Fort Grant, Arizona. He remained in the quartermaster's position until October 1895, and from December 1894 to April 1895 performed additional duty as Fort Grant's assistant chief of staff and post exchange officer. He was promoted to captain in April 1895.

== Continued career ==
From April 1895 to October 1898, Aleshire was an assistant quartermaster in charge of purchasing horses for the Cavalry and Field Artillery branches, and was stationed first at Jefferson Barracks Military Post near St. Louis, and later Fort Sheridan near Chicago. In May 1898, the army expanded for the Spanish–American War, and he was promoted to temporary Major in the United States Volunteers. From October 1898 to December 1898 he served in Cuba as acting chief quartermaster and chief quartermaster of First Army Corps. From December 1898 to November 1899, Aleshire was assigned as chief quartermaster of the Department of Matanzas, and he was a temporary lieutenant colonel from November 1898 to April 1899. As a temporary major, Aleshire was chief quartermaster of the Department of Department of Santiago and Puerto Principe, Cuba from November 1899 to July 1900.

After his service in Cuba, Aleshire was assigned to duty in the Philippines. From October 1900 to February 1901 he was chief quartermaster of the China Relief Expedition, the U.S. effort to protect American lives and property in China during the Boxer Rebellion. He was promoted to permanent major in February 1901 and discharged from the Volunteers the following May. During the Philippine–American War, Aleshire served as head of the Army Transport Service in Manila from March 1901 to March 1903. From March to June 1903 he commanded the U.S. Army supply depot in Manila. After returning to the United States, Aleshire performed staff duty in the Office of the Quartermaster General from September 1903 to June 1907, and advanced to first assistant quartermaster general.

== Later career ==
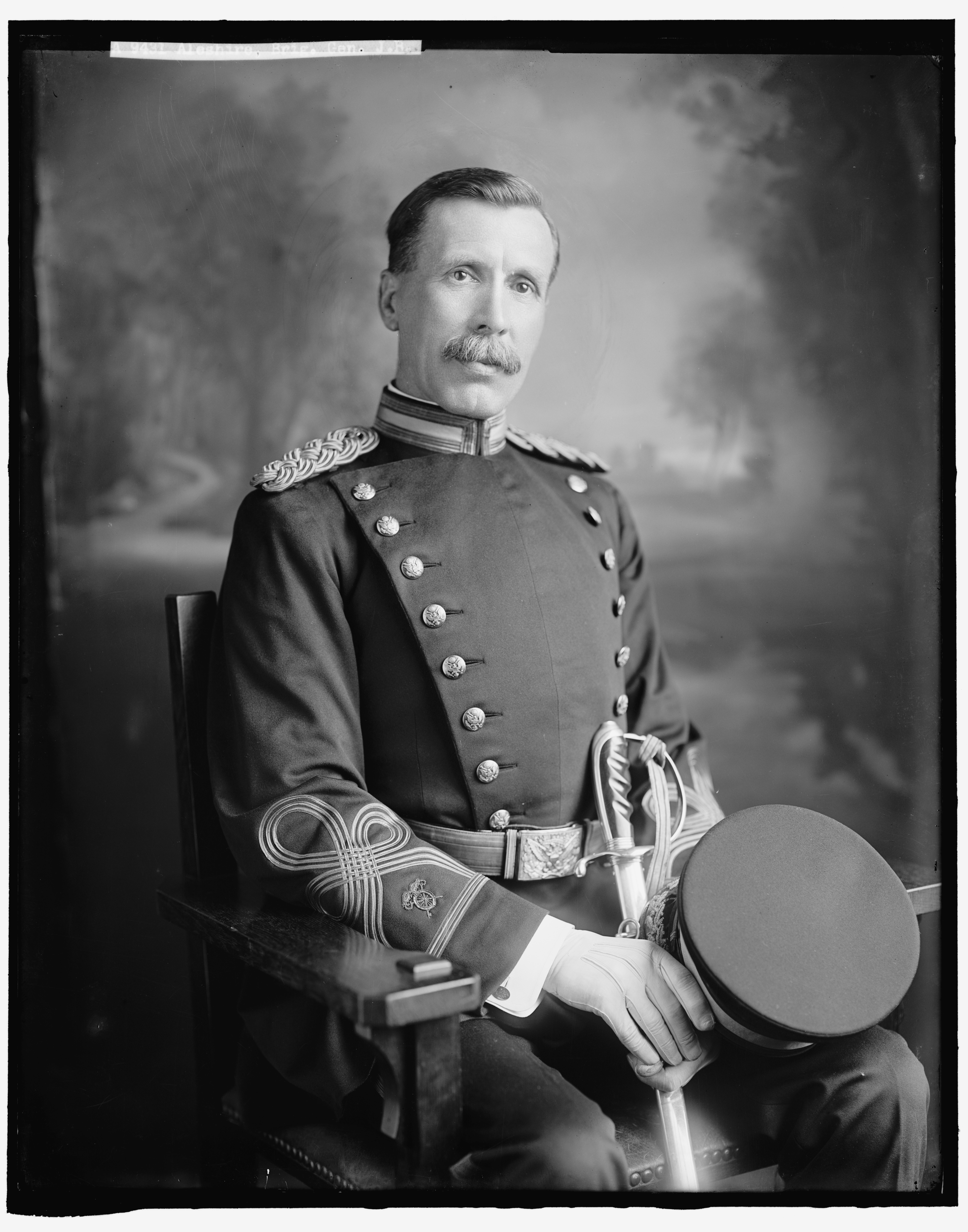
Aleshire as a Major in the Quartermaster Corps, c. 1903. Harris and Ewing photograph.

In July 1907, Aleshire was appointed Quartermaster General of the United States Army and advanced in rank from major to brigadier general. Despite the fact that there were 17 quartermaster officers senior to him, Aleshire was recommended to President Theodore Roosevelt by the incumbent Quartermaster General, Charles Frederic Humphrey Sr., who had served with Aleshire in Cuba and the Philippines. In addition, Aleshire was endorsed by William Howard Taft, the Secretary of War, who had been impressed with Aleshire's performance in the Philippines during Taft's 1901 to 1903 term as provisional governor.

Aleshire continued to serve as Quartermaster General until retiring for disability in September 1916; he was appointed to a second term in August 1912 and promoted to major general. As Quartermaster General, Aleshire succeeded at eliminating the unwieldy centralized control of the army supply system that had grown up after the end of the American Civil War. In addition to creating administrative departments at his headquarters to manage the day to day operations of the Quartermaster Corps, he replaced centralized purchasing with a decentralized system that saved time and money by enabling department, division, and unit quartermasters to procure supplies locally. In addition, Aleshire accomplished the creation of a consolidated Quartermaster Corps by merging the army's Quartermaster, Subsistence and Pay Departments.

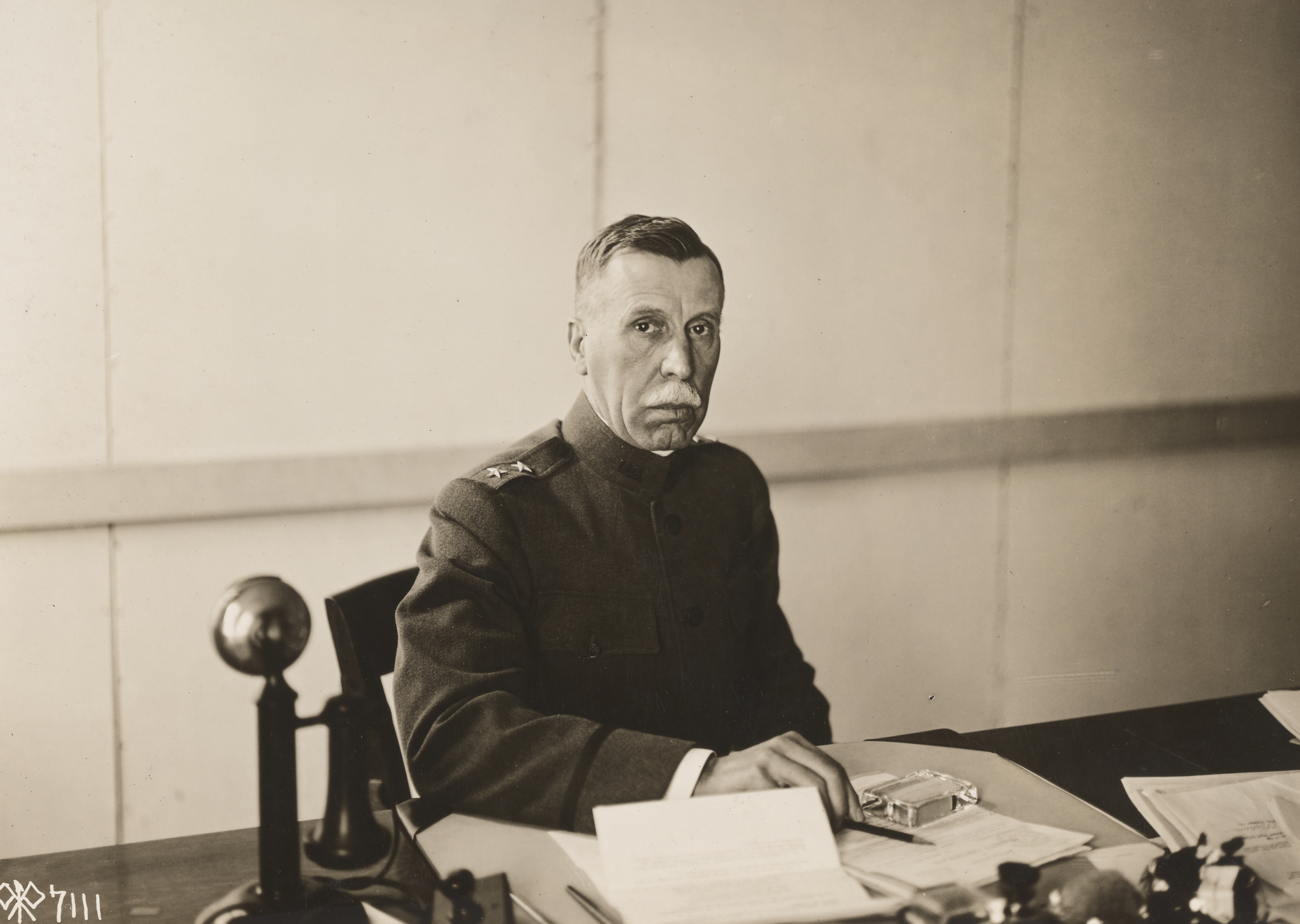
Aleshire as chairman of the National Defense Council's Priority Committee, pictured here on March 28, 1918.

During Aleshire's tenure, he was responsible for creation of the United States Army Remount Service, which provided horses, mules, and dogs to the army. The Remount Service established remount depots at Fort Reno, Oklahoma, Fort Keogh, Montana, and Front Royal, Virginia. The Remount Service continued to operate until the end of World War II, when its functions were taken over by the United States Department of Agriculture.

Aleshire was appointed to a third term as Quartermaster General in August 1916, but declining health caused him to retire for disability a month later. When he retired, Aleshire requested return to active duty if the United States entered World War I. In June 1917, two months after the American entry into the war, he was recalled and appointed to the Council of National Defense, the federal government body that planned and coordinated farm, industrial, financial, and transportation support to the war effort. He was subsequently appointed chairman of the council's Priority Committee, and he served until retiring for the second time in July 1918.

== Retirement and death ==
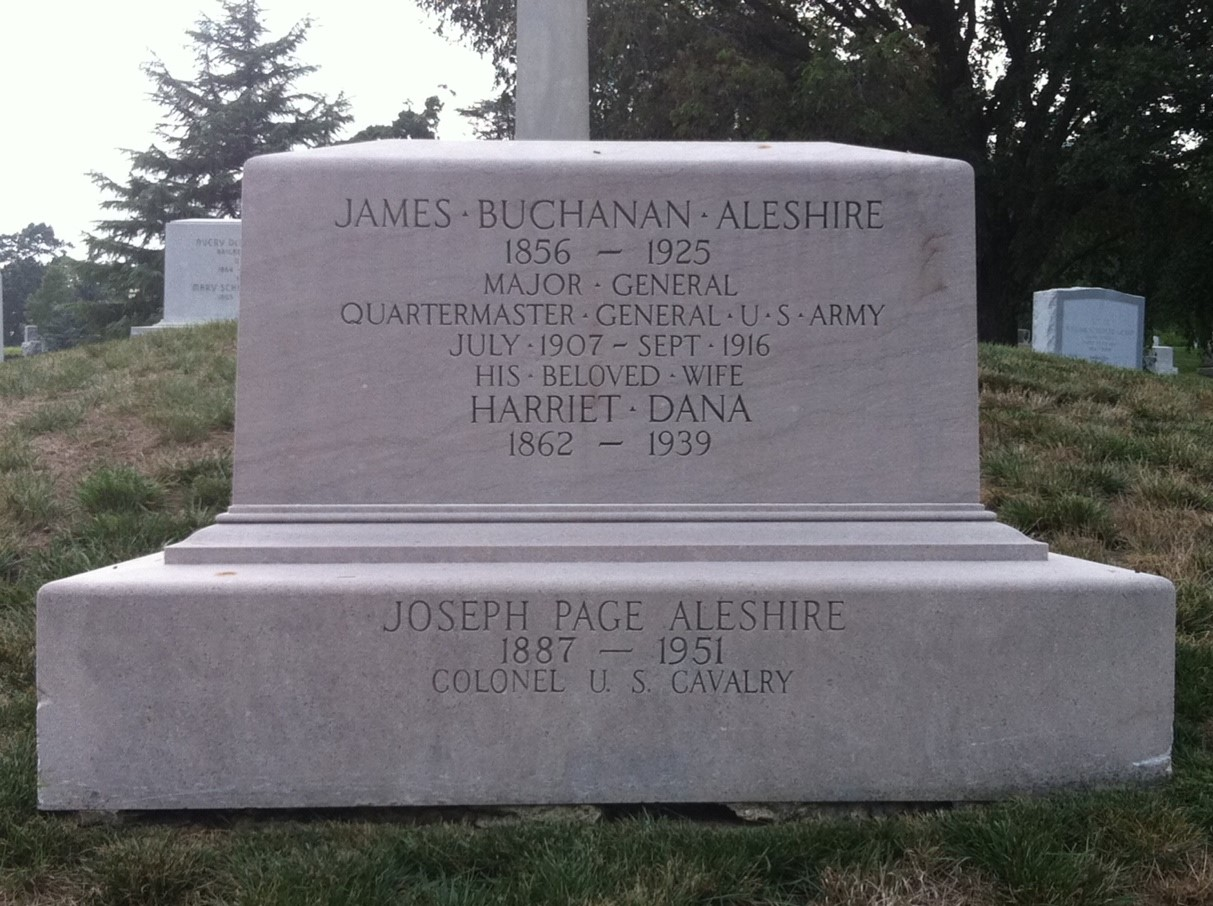
Grave of Aleshire at Arlington National Cemetery

In retirement, Aleshire resided in Sheridan, Wyoming. He died in Sheridan on June 1, 1925. Aleshire was buried at Arlington National Cemetery.

== Awards ==
During his career, Aleshire received the following awards: (Note: Based on the assignments Aleshire carried out during his career, he was eligible for four campaign medals and the World War I Victory Medal.)

- Indian Campaign Medal
- Spanish War Service Medal
- Philippine Campaign Medal
- China Campaign Medal
- World War I Victory Medal

== Legacy ==
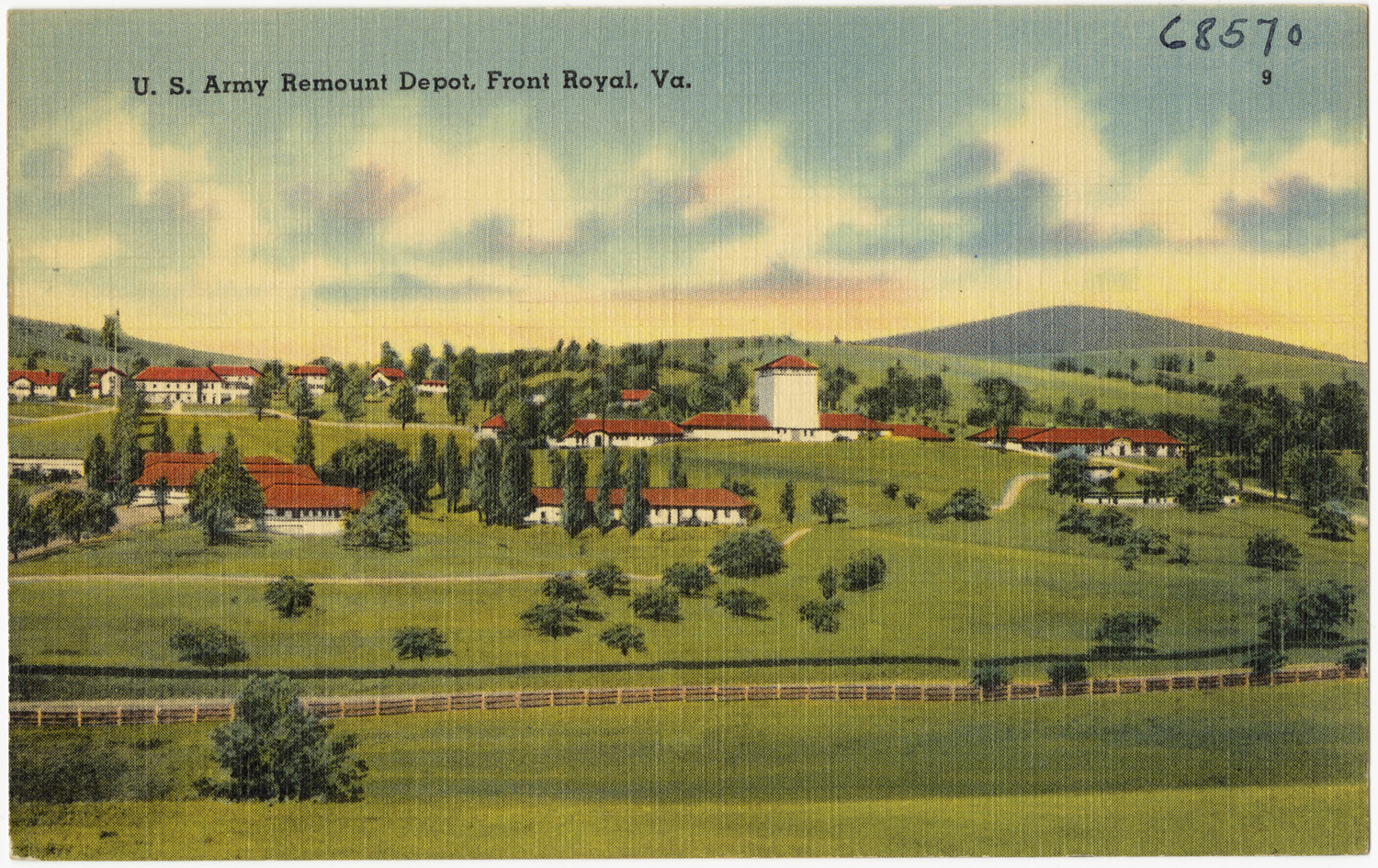
Postcard illustration of Front Royal (Virginia) Remount Depot, which was named for Aleshire

Following the China relief expedition, Aleshire was one of the organizers of the Military Order of the Dragon and served on the organization's executive committee. Aleshire was also an active member of the Military Order of the Carabao following his Philippines service; in December 1913, he was appointed to a committee that visited President Woodrow Wilson to formally apologize after news reports indicated songs disparaging of Wilson and the Filipino people had been sung at the group's annual gathering earlier in the month.

In 1914, the Army Transport Service acquired a tugboat, which was renamed U.S.T. Maj. Gen. J.B. Aleshire. In 1946, Aleshire was taken out of service and sold to a New York City ship towing company. Aleshire Road on Joint Base San Antonio, Texas is named for Aleshire. Aleshire Remount Depot in Front Royal, Virginia was named for him. He was inducted into the Quartermaster Corps Hall of Fame in 1989.

== Family ==
In 1886, Aleshire married Harriet A. Dana in Dubuque, Iowa. They were the parents of three children; Joseph, Margaret (sometimes known as Marjorie), and Dorothy.

Joseph Page Aleshire (1887–1951) was a 1910 West Point graduate. He served in World War I and World War II, attained the rank of colonel, and was a recipient of the Army Distinguished Service Medal, Silver Star, and Legion of Merit. Aleshire Road on Fort Bliss, Texas was named for him.

Margaret Deborah Aleshire (1889–1920) died at Tripler Army Medical Center after staying at the Fort Shafter, Hawaii home of her sister during an extended illness.

Dorothy Dana Aleshire (1893–1968) was the wife of Alexander Gilchrist Hatch, a United States Naval Academy graduate who attained the rank of lieutenant commander as a submarine commander during World War I.
