= Charles Justin Bailey =

United States Army general (1859–1946)

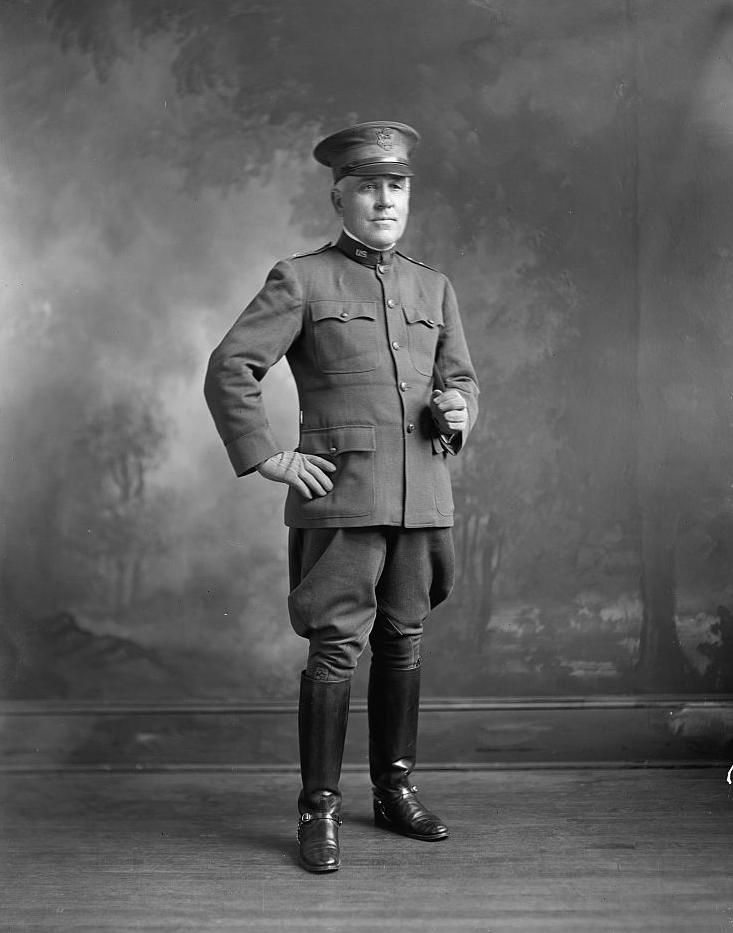
- Bailey in 1918
- Born: June 21, 1859; Tamaqua, Pennsylvania, U.S.
- Died: September 21, 1946 (aged 87); Jamestown, New York, U.S.
- Burial place: Lake View Cemetery; Jamestown, New York, U.S.
- Military career
- Allegiance: United States
- Branch: United States Army
- Service years: 1880–1922
- Rank: Major General
- Service number: 0-37
- Unit: 81st Division
- Conflicts: World War I
- Awards: Distinguished Service Medal; Legion of Honor (France); Croix de Guerre (France); Order of Leopold II (Belgium)

Charles Justin Bailey (June 21, 1859 – September 21, 1946) was a major general in the United States Army who commanded the 81st Infantry Division during World War I.

== Early life and education ==
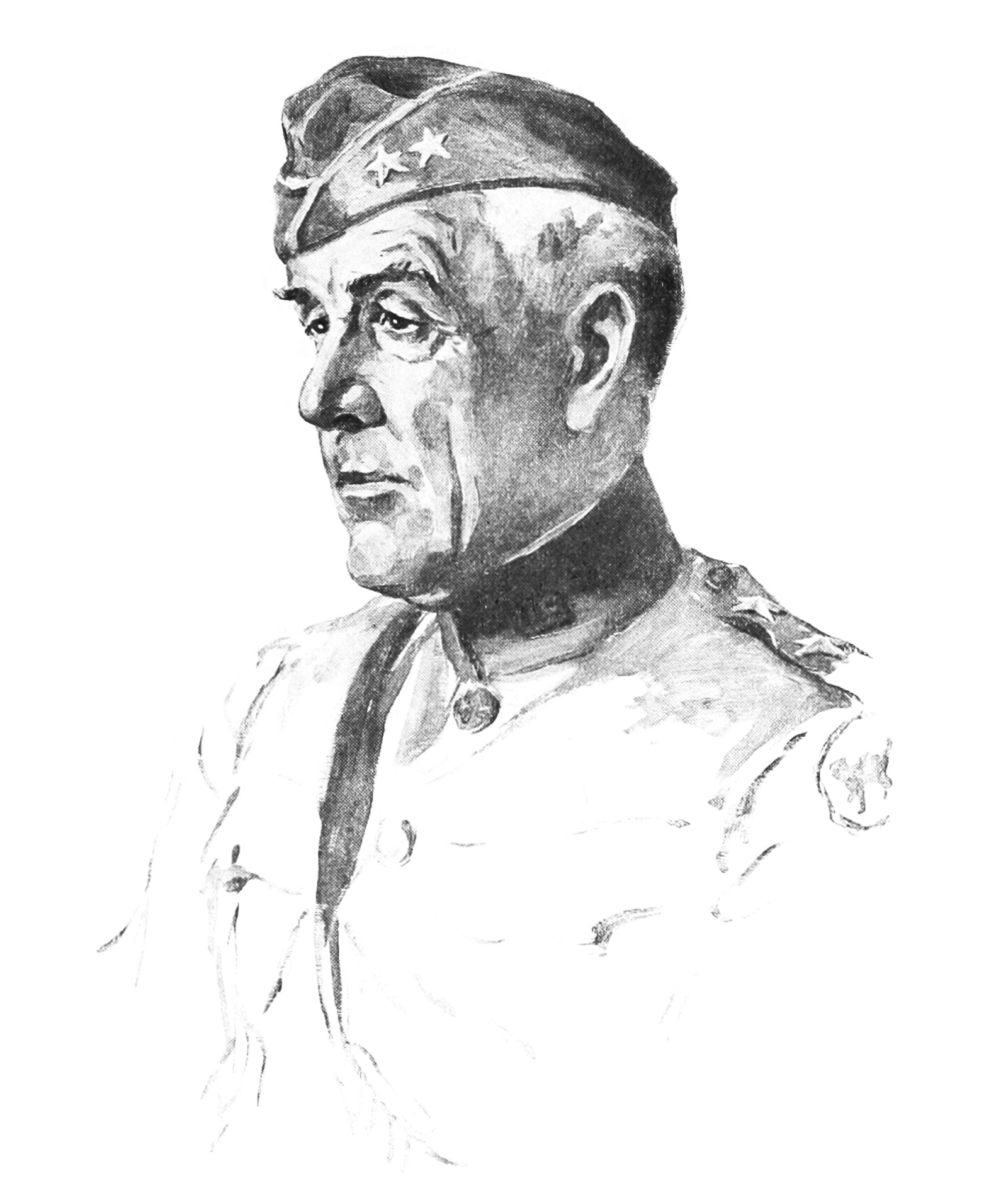
An illustration of Bailey as a World War I commander of the 81st Division Infantry Division

Bailey was born in Tamaqua, Pennsylvania, on June 21, 1859. He attended the United States Military Academy (USMA) at West Point, New York, from where he graduated, eighth in a class of 52, in June 1880. Among his fellow classmates there at the academy were several men who would, like Bailey himself, eventually attain the rank of brigadier general or higher in their military careers, such as George W. Goethals, William C. Rafferty, John L. Chamberlain, Frederick S. Strong, James B. Aleshire, James B. Erwin, William S. Scott, George Bell Jr., and Henry G. Sharpe.

After his graduation, he was commissioned a second lieutenant in the 1st Artillery Regiment.

== Career ==
=== U.S. Army Coast Artillery Corps ===
Bailey specialized in coastal artillery, and his earliest assignments included postings to: Fort Adams, Rhode Island; Fort Canby, Washington; the Presidio of San Francisco; Alcatraz Citadel, California; and Fort Mason. He was a student at the Fort Monroe, Virginia Artillery School in 1888, after which he was promoted to first lieutenant.

In the 1890s, Bailey's assignments included: the staff of the 1st Artillery at Fort Hamilton, New York; the staff of the Artillery District of New Orleans at Jackson Barracks; and professor of Military Science at the University of Vermont. In 1898 he received the honorary degree of Master of Arts from UVM.

=== Spanish–American War ===
During the Spanish–American War, Bailey served at Fort San Jacinto, Texas, as commander of Battery G, 1st Artillery Regiment, and then at Fort Preble, Maine, where he commanded a battery of the 7th Artillery Regiment. He was promoted to captain in 1899.

After the war, Bailey serve at Sandy Hook Proving Ground until 1902. From 1902 to 1904 he was stationed at Fort Totten, New York and assigned to disburse funds on programs for acquiring and employing mines for defense U.S. harbors, as well as serving on a board that conducted experiments with using torpedoes for coastal defense. In 1905 he was promoted to major and assigned as commander of the Artillery District of New Orleans at Jackson Barracks. He subsequently served on the General Staff at the War Department and as Secretary of the Army War College. From 1908 to 1911, he was senior assistant to the Chief of Coast Artillery. He was promoted to colonel in 1911 and brigadier general in 1913.

From 1911 to 1913, Bailey commanded the 1st Provisional Coast Artillery Regiment at Fort Crockett, Texas. In 1913 he was assigned to command the coast defenses of Puget Sound, Washington, after which he returned to Fort Totten as commander of the North Atlantic Coast Artillery District. From 1914 to 1917 he commanded the coastal defenses of Manila and Subic Bays in the Philippines.

=== World War I ===
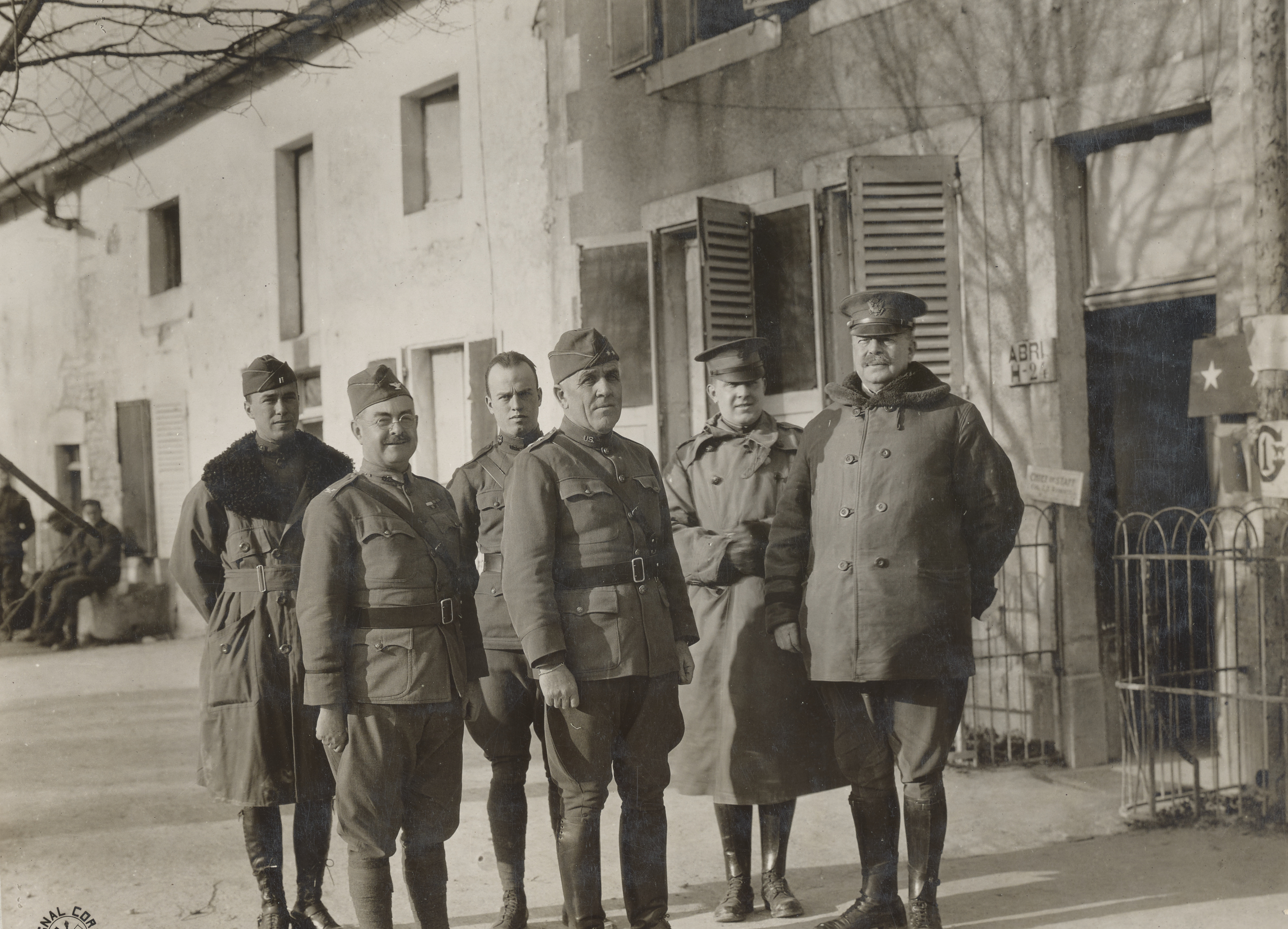
Major General Joseph T. Dickman (far right), commander of the newly created U.S. Third Army, Bailey, and Lieutenant Colonel Charles D. Roberts, the 81st's Infantry Division's chief of staff, and other unknown officers at Belrupt-en-Verdunois, Meuse, France, in November 1918

On August 5, 1917, Bailey was promoted to major general in the National Army and assigned to command the Philippine Department.

In 1918, he was assigned as commander of the 81st Division, which he commanded in France from 1918 to 1919.

=== Post-World War I ===
In 1919, Bailey was selected to command the Middle Atlantic Coast Artillery District at Fort Totten, and returned to his permanent rank of brigadier general. He assumed command of Department of the East at Governors Island, New York on October 13, 1919.

He then commanded the 7th Division at Fort Meade, Maryland. He was again promoted to major general, and commanded the Third Corps area at Fort Howard, Maryland, until retiring in 1922.

== Awards and decorations ==
He was awarded the Distinguished Service Medal, the Order of Leopold (Belgium), the Croix de Guerre with palm, and was an officer of the Legion of Honor.

== Personal life ==
In 1885, Bailey married Mary M. Dodge. They were the parents of two daughters, Omira and Merry. Omira Bailey was the wife of Army Colonel Alexander Wheeler Chilton, and Merry was the wife of Army Colonel Charles Lewis Gandy.

Bailey's first wife died in 1923. In 1924, he married Elizabeth Hegeman Bailey.

== Death and burial ==
Bailey suffered a hip fracture in a fall in July 1945 and never fully recovered. He died on September 21, 1946, at his home in Jamestown, New York. Bailey was buried at Lake View Cemetery in Jamestown, New York.

== Sources ==
=== Internet ===
- Chilton, Alexander Wheeler (1947). "Memorial, Charles Justin Bailey, 1880". apps.westpointaog.org. West Point, NY: West Point Association of Graduates.

=== Books ===
- Davis, Henry Blaine Jr. (1998). Generals in Khaki. Raleigh, NC: Pentland Press. p. 17. ISBN 978-1-57197-088-6.
