= Henry Granville Sharpe =

United States Army general

Henry Sharpe
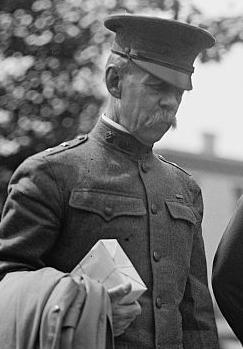
- Major General Henry Sharpe, 1917.
- Born: April 30, 1858; Kingston, New York, United States
- Died: July 13, 1947 (aged 89); Providence, Rhode Island, United States
- Burial place: Arlington National Cemetery, Virginia, United States
- Military career
- Allegiance: United States
- Branch: United States Army
- Service years: 1880–1882; 1883–1920
- Rank: Major General
- Service number: 0-12994
- Unit: Infantry Branch
- Commands: Commissary General of Subsistence; Quartermaster General; Southeastern Department
- Conflicts: American Indian Wars; Spanish–American War; Philippine–American War; World War I

Major General Henry Granville Sharpe (April 30, 1858 – July 13, 1947) was a United States Army officer who served as the 24th Quartermaster General of the U.S. Army from 1916 to 1918, including during World War I.

== Early life ==
Sharpe was born in Kingston, New York, in 1858, and was the son of Civil War veteran Brevet Major General George H. Sharpe and his wife, Caroline Hone (Hasbrouck) Sharpe. Both of his parents were descendants of the Hasbrouck family; his maternal grandfather was Congressman and Rutgers University president Abraham Bruyn Hasbrouck; his paternal great-grandfather was Congressman Abraham Joseph Hasbrouck.

His sister, Katherine Lawrence Hasbrouck, married Congressman Ira Davenport, and his brother Severyn Bruyn Sharpe was the Ulster County judge in 1898. He is also a descendant of Louis DuBois. Sharpe was the second cousin of Major General Robert W. Hasbrouck.

He attended the United States Military Academy (USMA) at West Point, New York, graduating 46th in a class of 52 in June 1880. Among his fellow classmates there at the academy were several men who would, like Sharpe himself, eventually attain the rank of brigadier general or higher in their military careers, such as George W. Goethals, William C. Rafferty, John L. Chamberlain, Charles J. Bailey, Frederick S. Strong, James B. Aleshire, James B. Erwin, William S. Scott, and George Bell Jr.

== Military career ==
Sharpe served on frontier duty with the 4th Infantry Regiment at Fort Laramie, Wyoming for the next year and a half. Following a six months' leave of absence, he submitted his resignation from the army to take effect June 1, 1882.

About fifteen months later on September 12, 1883, Sharpe was reappointed to the army as a commissary of subsistence with the rank of captain and assigned to temporary duty at New York City. He was then stationed at the USMA from 1884 to 1889.

From 1889 to 1898, he served as a commissary officer at various locations to include Washington, Oregon and the St. Louis Depot. He was promoted to the rank of major on November 13, 1895. He transferred from St. Louis to Boston on March 15, 1897, but assumed his duties there only after he had purchased and distributed supplies for the relief of sufferers from the Mississippi flood at St. Louis, Missouri and at Cairo, Illinois.

When war with Spain was imminent in April 1898, he was appointed chief commissary of the First Army Corps, and deployed with the Corps to Puerto Rico. There he was promoted to lieutenant colonel and appointed an assistant commissary general of subsistence. He remained on duty in Puerto Rico until December 21, 1898.

For a short time, he was assigned to the Chicago Depot as purchasing commissary general, but in September 1899 he was ordered to Washington to act as assistant to the Commissary General of Subsistence. This assignment lasted until the spring of 1902. He was then sent to Manila as chief commissary of the Division of the Philippines. By that time he been promoted to the rank of colonel and was the senior officer in the Subsistence Department.

On October 3, 1900, he was elected as a hereditary companion of the New York Commandery of the Military Order of the Loyal Legion of the United States by right of his father's service in the Union Army during the American Civil War.

Sharpe's tour of duty in the Philippines lasted until he was again recalled to Washington to act as assistant to the Commissary General of Subsistence. He served in this capacity from June 22, 1904, to October 8, 1905. He was commissioned Commissary General of Subsistence with the rank of brigadier general on October 12, 1905, and was reappointed for a second four-year detail in 1909.

In the summer of 1907, he sailed to Europe at his own expense to investigate the supply departments of the British, French, and German armies. He visited the schools for bakers and cooks maintained by those armies. The data he obtained on the use of rolling kitchens in the French and German armies materially assisted in the development of similar equipment suitable for the U.S. Army.

Upon his return to Washington in September 1907, General Sharpe submitted recommendations to the War Department urging the establishment of a supply corps. While these were not adopted, they undoubtedly proved helpful when the subject of consolidating the Quartermaster, Subsistence, and Pay Departments into one agency was being considered four years later. Sharpe was so enthusiastic about establishing a consolidated supply corps that Quartermaster General James B. Aleshire called him the father of consolidation. Many of Sharpe's friends recommended that he be selected to head the newly created Quartermaster Corps in 1912. But when his classmate, General Aleshire, was appointed, Sharpe accepted a subordinate post in the Corps and worked devotedly to prove the value of consolidation.

When ill health brought General Aleshire's retirement four years later, General Sharpe was appointed to succeed him as Quartermaster General on September 16, 1916. This was approximately seven months before the United States declared war against Germany.

=== World War I ===
The Quartermaster Corps and the War Department generally were unprepared for World War I. The supply bureaus within the Quartermaster Corps were eager to procure and ship as quickly as possible the enormous quantities of supplies for which they were responsible. However, their uncoordinated procurement resulted in excessive and unbalanced railway shipments that overtaxed port facilities and finally developed into a serious congestion of the railroad system in the winter of 1917–18. By that time shortages in clothing, hospital equipment, and other supplies were causing hardships in Army camps, and it was charged by some that the lack of adequate clothing and shelter was responsible for an epidemic of pneumonia sweeping through the camps.

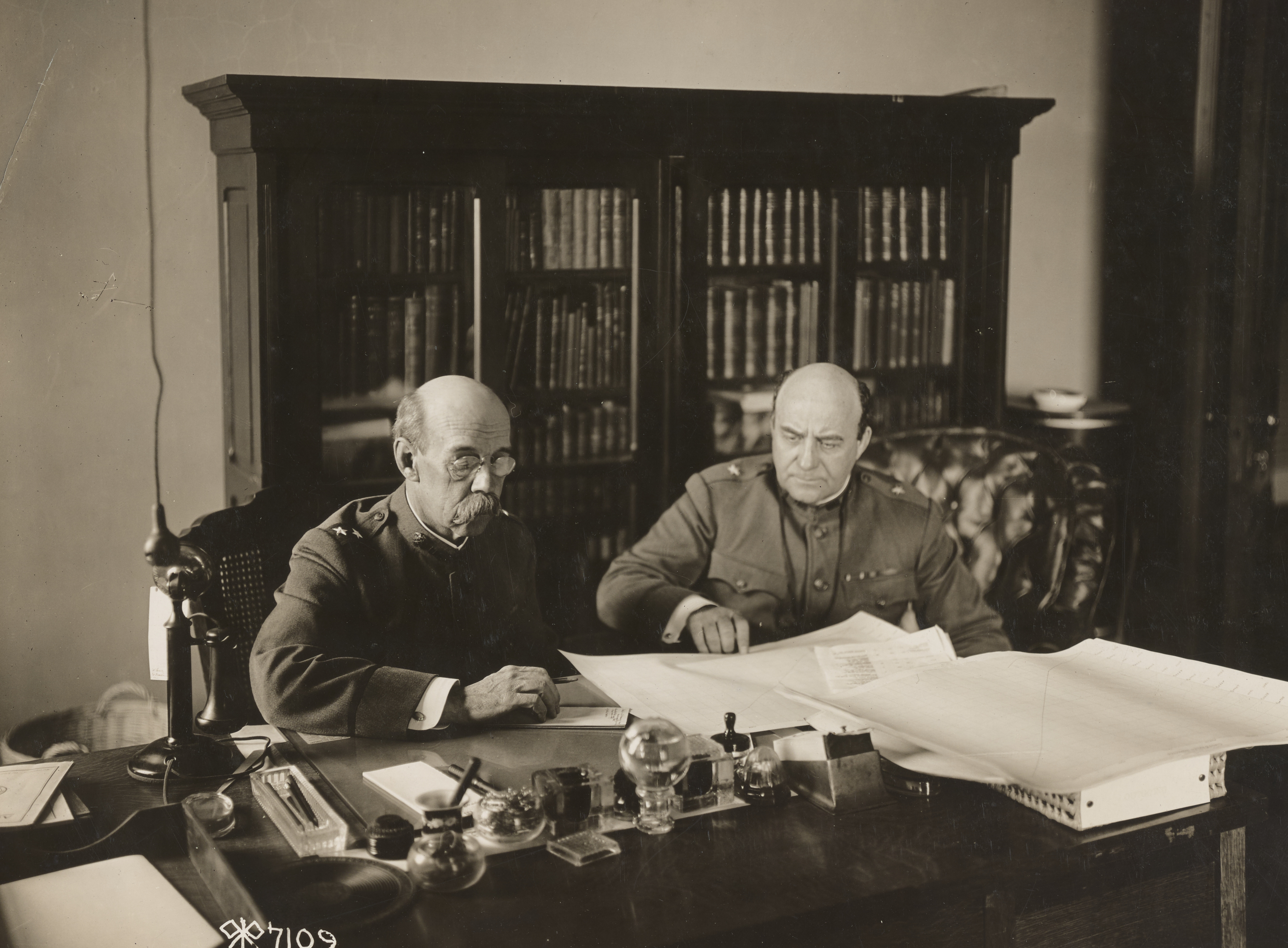
Major General Henry G. Sharpe and Brigadier General Chauncey B. Baker, both members of the War Council, March 28, 1918.

General Sharpe was held responsible by many for a large share of the supply crisis that had developed.

These developments stirred a widespread uneasiness that led to a Congressional hearing on the conduct of the war. In the end the General Staff took complete control of supplies and the Office of the Director of Purchase and Storage in the Purchase, Storage, and Traffic Division was erected on the foundation of the Quartermaster Corps.

On December 15, 1917, a War Council was formed consisting of the Secretary of War, the Assistant Secretary of War, the Quartermaster General, the Chief of Artillery, the Chief of Ordnance, the Judge Advocate General, and the Chief of Staff. The War Council was to oversee and coordinate all matters of supply and to plan for the more effective use of the military power of the nation. While serving on the Council, General Sharpe was required to delegate all his administrative duties to an acting chief quartermaster designated by the Secretary of War.

In June 1918, General Sharpe was relieved from duty with the War Council and assigned to the command of the Southeastern Department. The following month he was appointed a major general in the line of the Army, with rank from July 12 and officially ceased to be quartermaster general.

General Sharpe requested retirement on May 1, 1920, he was then 62.

== Retirement and death ==
In his later years, he lived in Providence, Rhode Island, where he died at the age of 89, on July 13, 1947. He was buried at Arlington National Cemetery.

General Sharpe was a Companion of the Military Order of the Loyal Legion of the United States by right of his father's service in the Union Army during the American Civil War.

== Legacy ==
General Sharpe was inducted into the Quartermaster Hall of Fame in 1989.
