= Grewcock =

Grewcock is a surname. Notable people with the surname include:

- Danny Grewcock (born 1972), English rugby union footballer
- George Grewcock (1862–1922), English cricketer
- Neil Grewcock (born 1962), English footballer
