= George Bell Jr. =

United States Army Major General

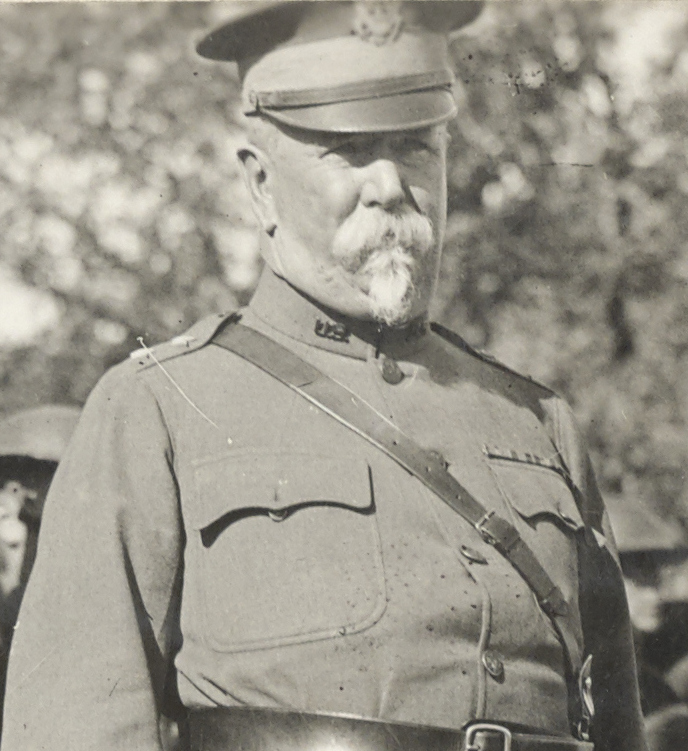
- Bell as commander of the 33rd Infantry Division in September 1918 towards the end of World War I
- Born: January 22, 1859; Baltimore, Maryland, U.S.
- Died: October 29, 1926 (aged 67); Chicago, Illinois, U.S.
- Burial place: Rosehill Cemetery, Chicago, Illinois, U.S.
- Relatives: George Bell (1828–1907) (father); Robert Ransom Jr. (Father in law)
- Military career
- Allegiance: United States
- Branch: United States Army
- Service years: 1880–1923
- Rank: Major General
- Nickname: "Do It Now"
- Service number: 0-38
- Unit: Infantry Branch
- Commands: 16th Regiment; El Paso District; 33rd Division; Sixth Corps Area
- Conflicts: American Indian Wars; Spanish–American War; Philippine Insurrection; Pancho Villa Expedition; World War I
- Awards: Army Distinguished Service Medal; Legion of Honor; Croix de Guerre
- Other work: President, Hill State Bank, Chicago

George Bell Jr. (January 22, 1859 – October 29, 1926) was a United States Army Major General who commanded the 33rd Infantry Division, an Army National Guard formation, during World War I.

== Early life and education ==
Bell was born on January 22, 1859, at Fort McHenry in Baltimore, Maryland, the son of Brigadier General George Bell (1828–1907), a veteran of the American Civil War, and his wife, Isabella McCormick Bell, he attended the United States Military Academy (USMA) at West Point, New York. His classmates at the U.S. Military included several men who would also eventually attained the rank of brigadier general or higher in their military careers, including James B. Aleshire, Charles Justin Bailey, John Loomis Chamberlain, James Brailsford Erwin, George Washington Goethals, Henry Granville Sharpe, Frederick S. Strong, and others.

== Career ==
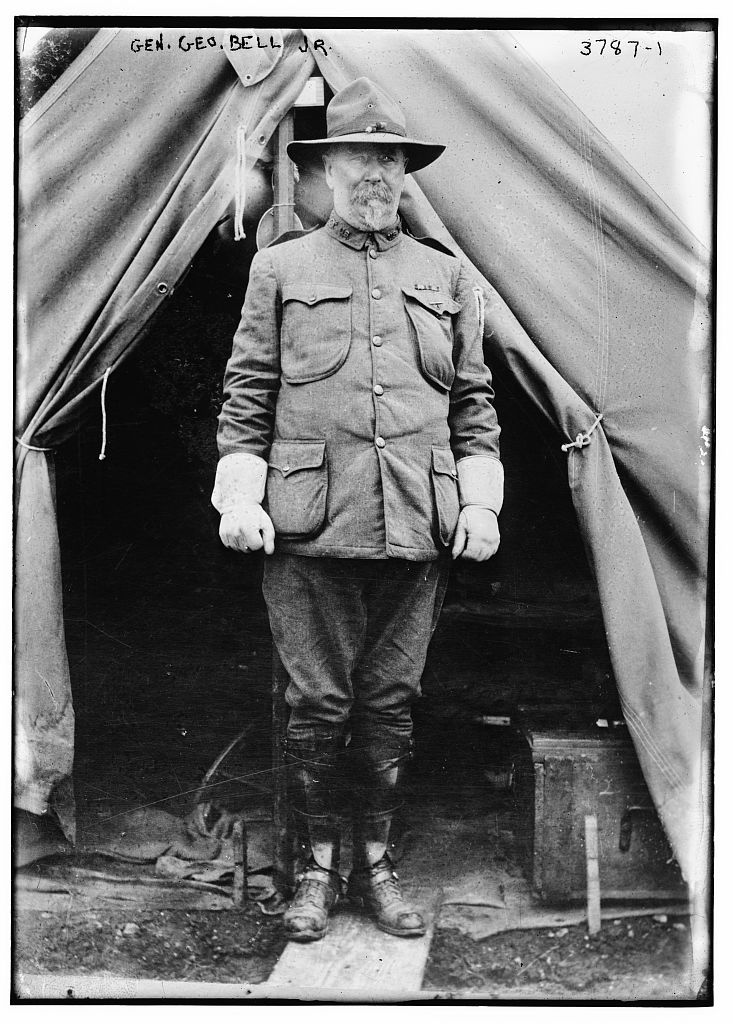
Bell in 1915

In June 1880, Bell graduated 43rd in his U.S. Military Academy class of 52, and became an infantry officer. He was posted to assignments throughout the country, including Fort Maginnis, Fort Shaw, Fort Ellis, Fort Snelling, and Fort Missoula. In the 1890s, he served as professor of military science at Cornell University. In 1894, he received a law degree from Cornell Law School and passed the New York bar exam.

He served in the Spanish–American War's Santiago Campaign and the Samar Campaign of the Philippine Insurrection. In 1907, Bell was appointed to the Infantry Equipment Board, taking part in the design of many items that were later used in World War I.

In 1913, Bell assumed command of the 16th Regiment at The Presidio in San Francisco. In 1916 he was promoted to brigadier general and assigned to head the El Paso District during the Pancho Villa Expedition.

=== World War I ===
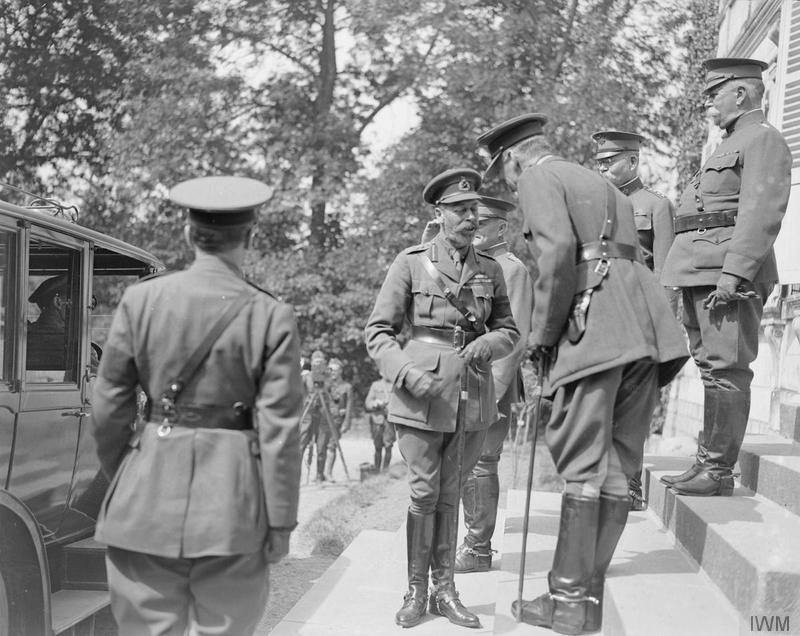
King George V congratulates General Sir Henry Rawlinson on the Battle of Amiens at Molliens-au-Bois Chateau, the headquarters of the U.S. 33rd Division, on August 12, 1918. The King was received at the Chateau by General John J. Pershing and General Tasker H. Bliss (both visible in the background) with Major General Bell visible next to Bliss.

Shortly after the American entry into World War I in April 1917, Bell was promoted to major general and assigned to command the Illinois National Guard's 33rd Division. He commanded throughout the war, with the 33rd, after months of strenuous training in the United States and arriving on the Western Front in May 1918, attaining distinction as the only American division to fight under its own flag and as part of British Empire (Australian) and French corps. The 33rd Division, under Bell's leadership, took part in the Battle of Hamel, the Second Battle of the Somme, the Battle of Saint-Mihiel and the Meuse–Argonne offensive, the largest battle in the history of the U.S. Army. By the time the war ended due to the Armistice with Germany in November 1918, the division had sustained over 6,800 casualties.

William Hood Simpson served alongside Bell throughout most of the American involvement in the war. He later became a full general and commanded the U.S. Ninth Army in World War II from 1944 to 1945.

=== Post World War I ===
After the war he commanded the Sixth Corps Area, with headquarters in Chicago, Illinois, until reaching the mandatory retirement in 1923 at age 64.

== Awards and decorations ==
Bell's awards included the Distinguished Service Medal, and his foreign honors included the French Croix de Guerre with Palm and the Legion of Honor, as well as appointment as a Knight Commander of England's Order of St. Michael and St. George. The citation to his Army DSM reads:

The President of the United States of America, authorized by Act of Congress, July 9, 1918, takes pleasure in presenting the Army Distinguished Service Medal to Major General George Bell, Jr., United States Army, for exceptionally meritorious and distinguished services to the Government of the United States, in a duty of great responsibility during World War I. General Bell led his command with distinction, in the offensive operations with the British which resulted in the capture of Hamel and Hamel Woods, and in the fighting on the Meuse that gained the villages of Marcheville, St. Hilaire, and a portion of Bois-de-Forges. The successful operations of the division which he trained and commanded in combat were greatly influenced by his energy and abilities as a commander.

== Post military career ==
After leaving the Army, Bell was elected President of Chicago's Hill State Bank.

== Death and burial ==
Bell's grave at Rosehill Cemetery

Bell died in Chicago, on October 29, 1926, at age 67. He was buried in Rosehill Cemetery and Mausoleum in Chicago.

== Legacy ==
Illinois' Bell Bowl Prairie amphitheater and Chicago's Bell Park and George Bell American Legion Post are named for him. Fort Bell in Bermuda was also named for him.

== Bibliography ==
- Davis, Henry Blaine Jr. (1998). Generals in Khaki. Raleigh, North Carolina: Pentland Press. ISBN 1571970886. OCLC 40298151.
- Venzon, Anne Cipriano (2013). The United States in the First World War: an Encyclopedia. Hoboken, NJ: Taylor and Francis. ISBN 978-1-135-68453-2. OCLC 865332376.

Military offices
Preceded by Newly activated organization	Commanding General 33rd Division; 1917−1919	Succeeded by Post deactivated
Preceded by Leonard Wood	Commanding General Sixth Corps Area; 1921–1922	Succeeded by George Van Horn Moseley
