= Bell School (Washington D.C.) =

Early school for African American children

Bell School, established in 1807, was the first school for African Americans in Washington, DC. It was located near Providence Hospital. The school was founded by three formerly enslaved men: George Bell, Nicholas Franklin, and Moses Liverpool.

== Founding ==
George Bell, Nicholas Franklin, and Moses Liverpool worked as caulkers at the Washington Navy Yard. The three men, who were formerly enslaved, co-founded and built a one-story school house. Their school, the Bell School, was located in the Capitol Hill neighborhood. The original Bell School closed after few years due to a lack of funding. The school is considered to be Washington D.C.'s first school for African Americans.

Bell co-founded the Resolute Beneficial Society, a society that supported health, education, and burial needs of Washington D.C.'s Black community. The society successfully re-opened the Bell School in 1818.
