= George Ball =

George Ball may refer to:

- George H. Ball (1819–1907), American academic and founder of Keuka College in New York
- George M. Ball (1832–1903), English politician and trade unionist
- George Washington Ball (Iowa Democrat) (1847–1915), American lawyer and politician from Iowa
- George Washington Ball (Iowa Republican) (1848–1920), American businessman and politician from Iowa
- George Alexander Ball (1862–1955), American manufacturer
- Sir George Joseph Ball (1885–1961), British barrister, intelligence officer, administrator, and industrialist
- George Thalben-Ball (1896–1987), originally George Thomas Ball, Australian-born English composer
- George Ball (diplomat) (1909–1994), American diplomat
- George Ball (cricketer) (1914–1997), English cricketer
- George Ball (tennis) (fl. 1940s–50s), American participant in the 1957 U.S. National Championships – Men's Singles
- George Ball (entomologist) (1926–2019), American entomologist
- George Ball (American businessman), chairman and CEO of W. Atlee Burpee

== See also ==
- Georges Ball (1838–1928), Canadian politician and lumber merchant
- George Bull (disambiguation)
- George Bell (disambiguation)
