= Albert Lord (cricketer) =

English cricketer

Albert Lord (28 August 1888 – 29 March 1969) was an English cricketer who played for Leicestershire from 1910 to 1926. He was born and died in Barwell, Leicestershire. He appeared in 130 first-class matches as a right-handed batsman who bowled right arm medium pace. He scored 3,864 runs with a highest score of 102 and took 39 wickets with a best performance of five for 40.
