= Arthur Cobley =

English cricketer

Personal information
- Full name: Arthur Cobley
- Born: 5 October 1874; Barwell, Leicestershire, England
- Died: 21 April 1960 (aged 85); Evington, Leicestershire, England
- Batting: Right-handed
- Bowling: Right-arm medium

Domestic team information
- Years: Team
- 1897–1904: Leicestershire

Career statistics
Competition	First-class
Matches	9
Runs scored	139
Batting average	7.72
100s/50s	–/–
Top score	22
Balls bowled	238
Wickets	1
Bowling average	142.00
5 wickets in innings	–
10 wickets in match	–
Best bowling	1/9
Catches/stumpings	4/–
- Source: Cricinfo, 23 September 2012

Arthur Cobley (5 October 1874 – 21 April 1960) was an English cricketer. Cobley was a right-handed batsman who bowled right-arm medium pace. He was born at Barwell, Leicestershire.

Cobley made his first-class debut for Leicestershire against Yorkshire in the 1897 County Championship at Headingley. He made two further appearances in that season's County Championship, against Surrey and Warwickshire, while the following season he made two appearances in that season's County Championship, against Essex and Warwickshire. His next appearance for Leicestershire came in the 1903 County Championship against Derbyshire, while in that same season he also made a further first-class appearance against the touring Gentlemen of Philadelphia. His final two first-class appearances for the county came in the 1904 County Championship against Lancashire and Nottinghamshire. He scored a total of 139 runs at an average of 7.72 from his nine matches, with a high score of 22.

He died at Evington, Leicestershire, on 21 April 1960.
