= Thomas Chapman (cricketer) =

English cricketer

Thomas Alan Chapman (14 May 1918 – 20 February 1979) was an English cricketer who played for Leicestershire from 1946 to 1950 and for Rhodesia in the 1952–53 season.

He was born in Barwell, Leicestershire, and died in Marandellas, Rhodesia. He appeared in 58 first-class matches as a right-handed batsman who could stand in as a wicketkeeper. He scored 1,413 runs with a highest score of 124 not out and completed one stumping and 20 catches.
