= Attorney General Bell =

Attorney General Bell may refer to:

- John C. Bell (lawyer) (1861–1935), Attorney General of Pennsylvania
- Francis Bell (New Zealand politician) (1851–1936), Attorney-General of New Zealand
- Charles K. Bell (1853–1913), Attorney General of Texas
- Griffin Bell (1918–2009), Attorney General of the United States

== See also ==
- General Bell (disambiguation)
