= St Mary's Church, Barwell =

Church in Barwell, Leicestershire

Coordinates: 52°33′52″N 1°20′48″W

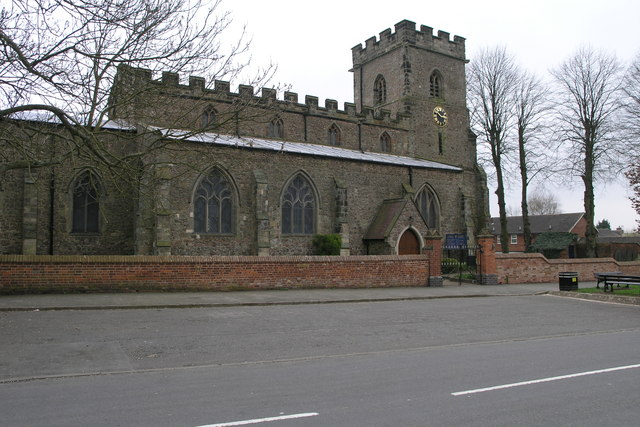
- Denomination: Church of England

History
- Dedication: St Mary

Administration
- Diocese: Leicester
- Archdeaconry: Loughborough
- Parish: Barwell, Leicestershire

Clergy
- Rector: Philip Watson

St Mary's Church is a church in Barwell, Leicestershire. It is a Grade I listed building.

== History ==
The church dates back to circa 1300–50. It consists of a 4-bay nave, north and south porch, north and south aisle and a tower containing 4 bells. The church was restored twice in the 19th century, in 1854 by "H. Goddard" (presumably the Leicester architect Henry Goddard), and in 1877.
