= John Powers (cricketer) =

English cricketer

Personal information
- Full name: John Powers
- Born: 30 September 1868; Barwell, Leicestershire, England
- Died: 9 November 1939 (aged 71); Leicester Forest East, Leicestershire, England
- Batting: Right-handed

Domestic team information
- Years: Team
- 1895–1896: Leicestershire

Career statistics
Competition	First-class
Matches	9
Runs scored	195
Batting average	12.18
100s/50s	–/–
Top score	25
Balls bowled	–
Wickets	–
Bowling average	–
5 wickets in innings	–
10 wickets in match	–
Best bowling	–
Catches/stumpings	4/–
- Source: Cricinfo, 20 January 2013

John Powers (30 September 1868 – 9 November 1939) was an English cricketer. Powers was a right-handed batsman. He was born at Barwell, Leicestershire.

Powers made his first-class debut for Leicestershire against Surrey at Grace Road in the 1895 County Championship. He made eight further first-class appearances for the county, the last of which came against Warwickshire in the 1896 County Championship. In his nine first-class matches for Leicestershire, he scored a total of 195 runs at an average of 12.18, with a high score of 25.

He died at Leicester Forest East, Leicestershire on 9 November 1939.
