= Barwell =

Village in Leicestershire, England

Coordinates: 52.56823°N 1.34616°W

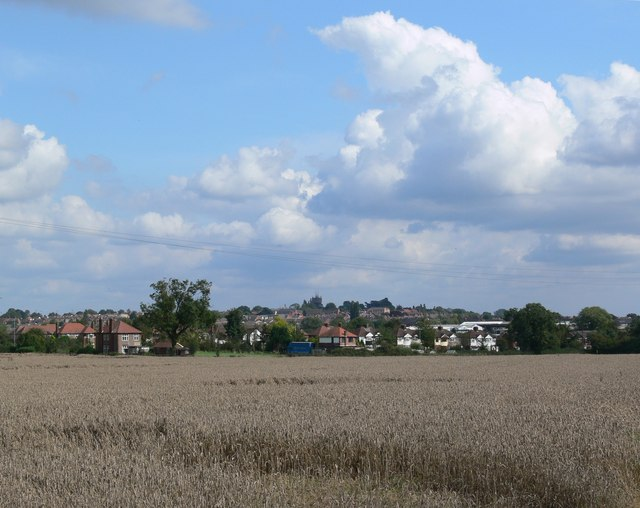

- Location within Leicestershire
- Population: 9,022 (2011 census)
- OS grid reference: SP444968
- District: Hinckley and Bosworth
- Shire county: Leicestershire
- Region: East Midlands
- Country: England
- Sovereign state: United Kingdom
- Post town: LEICESTER
- Postcode district: LE9
- Dialling code: 01455
- Police: Leicestershire
- Fire: Leicestershire
- Ambulance: East Midlands
- UK Parliament: Hinckley and Bosworth

Barwell is a village and civil parish in Leicestershire, England, with a population of 8,750 residents in 2001, increasing to 9,022 at the 2011 census. The name "Barwell" literally translates as "Stream of the Boar" and is said to originate from a boar that used to drink from the well near a brook in Barwell. It was originally known as "Borewell", but later became "Barwell". The brook near Barwell is not the River Tweed, but rather a local stream or brook in Leicestershire, possibly feeding into the River Soar or Avon, which are tributaries of the River Trent.

The village has two churches; Barwell Methodist Church in Chapel Street, and St Mary's Church, Barwell in Church Lane. St. Mary's was built in 1220. A board inside the church lists all of the rectors up to the present day, beginning with William in 1209.

The village has two football clubs, Barwell FC and AFC Barwell, as well as cricket teams and a large indoor bowling complex.

The Queens Head is the oldest public house, and second oldest building in the village. In 1902 the pub was owned by one Sarah Ann Powers. It was later owned by the Haines family. In recent years, the old pub roof has naturally deformed so that it is no longer straight. In the 1980s the front of the building was completely restored and returned to its original style after years of Victorian style "black and white".

== History ==
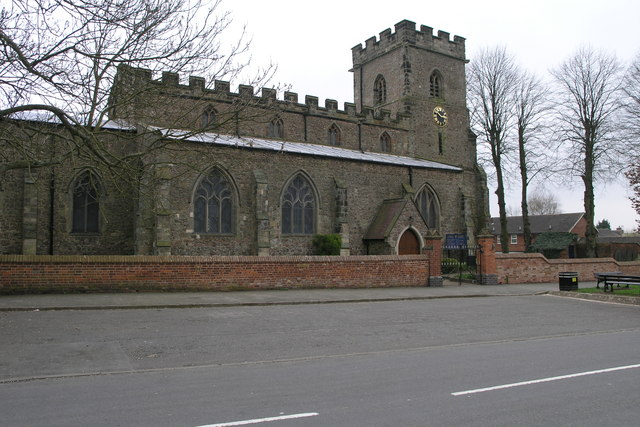
St Mary's Church, Barwell

It was on the lands of Leofric, Earl of Mercia, a rich and powerful magnate who had fought alongside Canute in his wars against Wessex. In old English, "wella" is the word for stream and "bar" the name for boar, and so this clearing in the woods was known in the Saxon tongue as Barwelle. In 1043, Earl Leofric and his wife, Godiva, established a Benedictine Abbey at Coventry and gave the Abbot and his twenty-four attendant monks, lands for their upkeep. Barwelle, along with nineteen other villages passed into the domains of the Abbot of Coventry.

Following the Norman Conquest, Barwelle was still held by the Abbey of Coventry. By 1086, there were 14 villagers with a priest, and 3 smallholders with 2 ploughs; a plough being a plot of land that can be cultivated by one team of oxen. There was a meadow 1 furlong by 1 furlong (201 by 201 m) in size and woodland 3 furlongs by 1 league (604 by 5556 m). The value of which was 30 shillings (£1.50).

The manor of Barwell which is described in Domesday Book as "ancient demesne", was later given to Hugh de Hastings, a steward and favourite of Henry I, and held in fee along with many other local manors from the priory of Coventry for the service of a single knight's fee.

In 1564 there were 48 families living in Barwell, according to a church census.

John Nichols describes an interesting tale of a wych-elm called "The Spreading Tree" or "Captain Shenton's tree" (pg. 476). As recounted, Captain Shenton who served in the royalist army returned to his house at Barwell with several other officers after the battle of Worcester. Hearing that the parliamentarians were looking for him he sank his portmanteau and valuables in the moat which surrounded the house, and sought refuge in the tree. Despite being close enough to overhear his enemies discussing the price on his head the bold Captain Shenton escaped capture and kept his estate, passing it on through his daughters. The tree was apparently held sacred for many years by the Powers family for preserving their ancestor.

In June 1646 the inhabitants of Barwell and surrounding villages made several submissions to the county committee for losses and free quarter from the local parliamentary garrisons. In June, 1646 Mr Gearey from Barwell claimed that Captain Ottaway from the Coventry garrison took a gelding worth five founds and that William Capenkwist and Thomas Bacon, his servants, had taken a mare worth one pound (Exchequer SP 28/161).

After a long and confusing list of owners, the manor of Barwell was purchased in 1660 by a certain John Oneby. Barwell was well known for its market gardeners that traditionally supplied the Leicester market with fresh produce. Nichols provides an interesting illustration of the church and its adjoining parsonage house (p. 477) pulled down in 1746 and rebuilt.

Until recent times, Barwell, together with neighbouring Earl Shilton, was a centre for shoe production in the East Midlands. The area is also known for hosiery, especially in nearby Hinckley.

=== Barwell meteorite ===
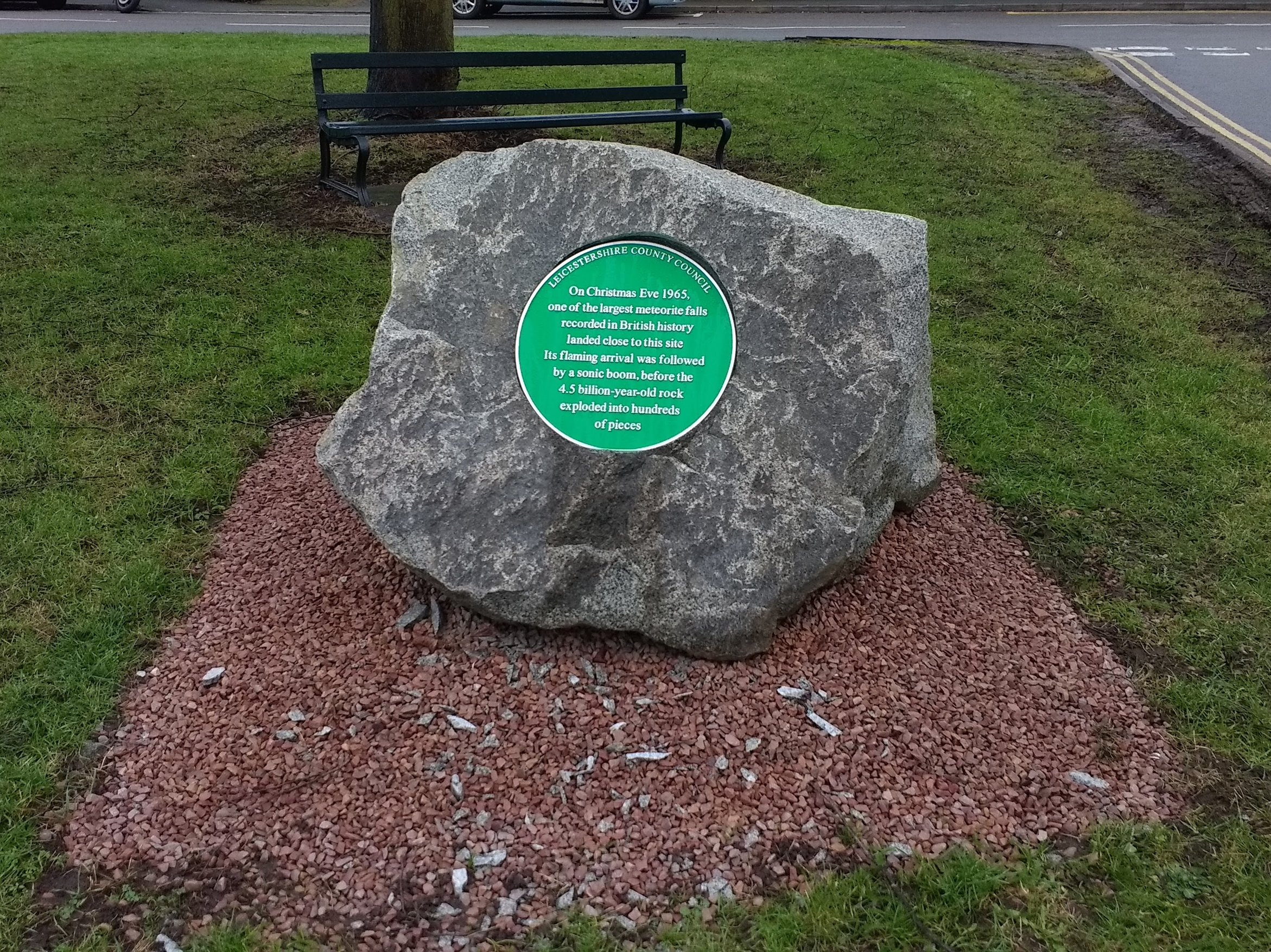
Barwell Meteorite Green Plaque, situated in the southern part of the village, close to the original meteorite fall

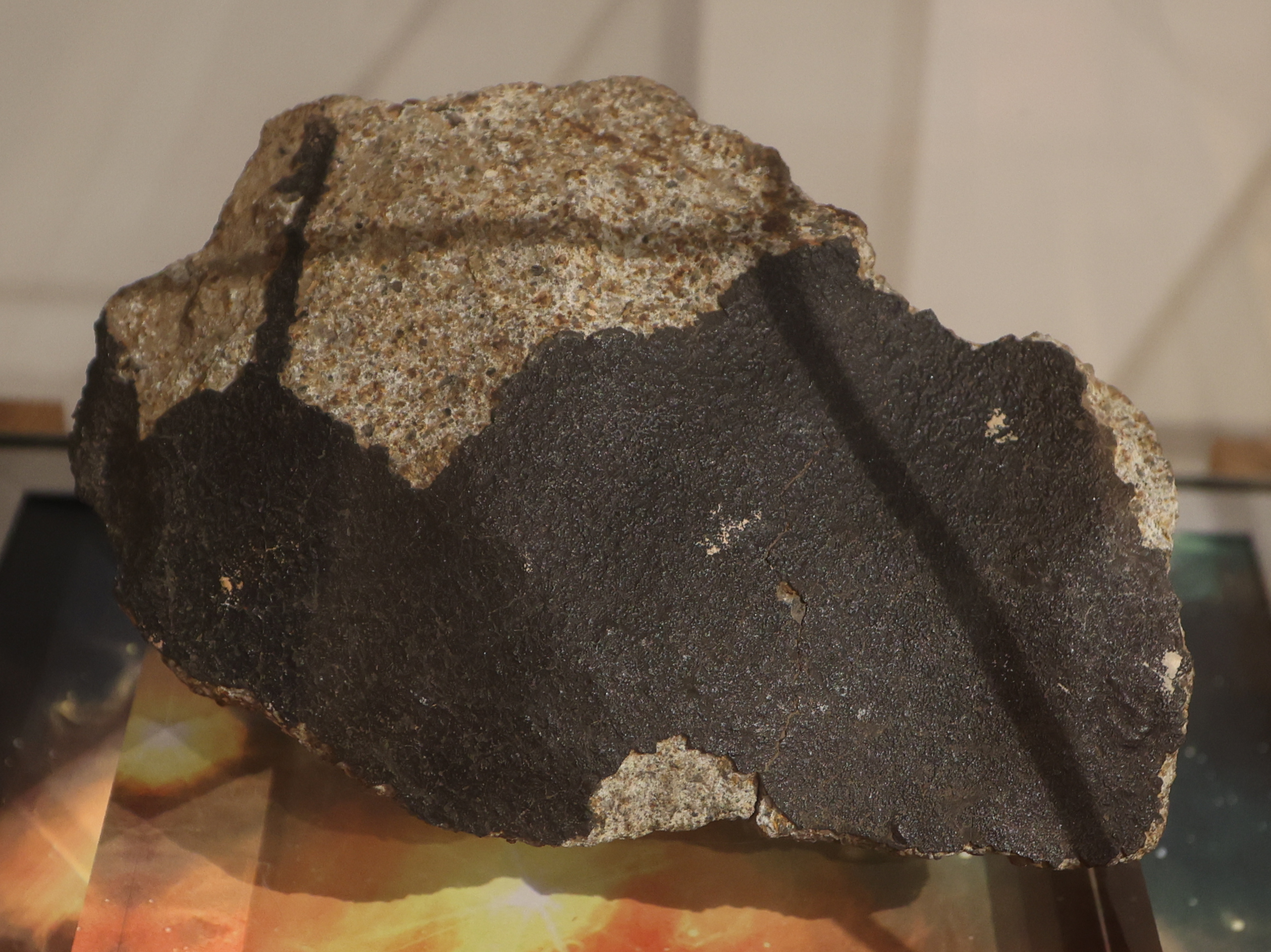
A fragment of the Barwell meteorite

Barwell and neighbouring Earl Shilton were the site of a meteor event when, on Christmas Eve 1965, the villages were showered with fragments from an object about the size of a traditional Christmas turkey. No one was hurt, although some minor damage to buildings and property occurred.

One meteorite went through the front of a car, destroying its engine. When the owner of the car attempted to claim on his insurance company, they replied that it was an "Act of God" and would not pay. Outraged, the owner went to the priest of the local church and asked for the money, saying "If it was an Act of God, the Church should pay for his car." The owner never received any money to repair his car.

Professor Sylvester-Bradley of Geology Dept at Leicester University confirmed that the fragments were from a chondrite and appealed for further specimens. Locals were requested not to wash any pieces found, but to wrap them in newspaper and hand in at the local police station.

A piece of the meteorite is on display at the Herbert Museum in Coventry.

In December 2016, Leicestershire County Council unveiled a plaque in Barwell, marking the meteorite event that happened within the village. The plaque was originally nominated by Barwell Parish Council and was later accepted by the County Council as part of their Green Plaque Awards Scheme. The plaque is situated towards the southern part of the village, close to the site of the original meteorite fall.

The inscription on the plaque reads:

On Christmas Eve 1965, one of the largest meteorite falls recorded in British history landed close to this site Its flaming arrival was followed by a sonic boom, before the 4.5 billion-year-old rock exploded into hundreds of pieces

== Community facilities ==
The local council launched a community house in 2009 to help tackle anti-social behaviour. As part of the scheme, the House hosts a number of events throughout the year.

Since 2017, the Barwell Bloomers have been brightening up the village with planters and hanging baskets.

=== Sport ===
Barwell takes part in the longest continuous cricket fixture in the world, when they play Coventry and North Warwickshire in their annual match. The match traditionally took place in Wakes week. The fixture began when the pastors of Coventry church and Barwell church arranged a game. The game was even played throughout the war, when representatives from each team would come and bowl an over at each other.

The village has a senior football team, Barwell, who play in the Southern Football League Premier Division Central. Following the demise in 2013 of Hinckley United this became the largest football side in the area. Barwell plays their home matches at Kirby Road.

In addition to the senior team, AFC Barwell is another football team which plays in the village. AFC Barwell has achieved community charter standard status and operates in the Earl Shilton and Hinckley area as well as Barwell. AFC Barwell offers football coaching and matches to around 300 children, both girls and boys, between the ages of 3 and 18 years old. AFC Barwell teams play in matches at weekends and train twice a week.

Since 2013, AFC Barwell's home has been a purpose-built Sports Complex located off Dovecote Way, Barwell. The £700,000 building was built by Barwell Parish Council with most of the grant funding coming from the Football Foundation.

== Notable people ==
- William Bradford (1660 - 1752), Early American publisher and printer
- Admiral Sir Hugo Lewis Pearson (1843 - 1912), Royal Navy officer
- George Grewcock (1862 - 1922), cricketer
- John Powers (1868 - 1939), cricketer
- Arthur Cobley (1874 - 1960), cricketer
- George Ward (1879 - 1951), former Member of Parliament for Bosworth
- George Geary (1893 - 1981), cricketer
- Albert Lord (1888 - 1969), cricketer
- George Ball (1919 - 1997), cricketer
- Thomas Chapman (1918 - 1979), cricketer
- Dame Carol M. Black (1939), physician and academic
- Michael Robinson (1958 - 2020), former Liverpool FC striker and Spanish TV football pundit
- Chris Kirkland (1981), former Leicester City goalkeeper

== Industry ==
Between the 19th and late 20th centuries, Barwell was a busy industrial village consisting of numerous shoe, hosiery and knitwear factories. These once large factories have all ceased trading. Competitive pressure from abroad was partly to blame; other factors included the 1965 credit squeeze which affected shoe and hosiery firms.

Nevertheless, Barwell still retains several industrial estates, including Dawsons Lane, Stapleton Lane (Stapleton Lane industrial estate has been demolished by the local council and is now a residential area with approximately thirty houses) and the larger Moat Way, which ostensibly specialise in warehousing and distribution. Examples include the parcel company Crowfoots Carriers employing around 100 people, Bachmann Industries Europe who design products locally, but have them manufactured in China by their parent company, Kader Industries.

Some smaller and specialist manufacturers still remain, such as Labelsco, which produces labels for the pharmaceutical industry.

Arriva Midlands operate their Hinckley local bus services from a depot within the village alongside the ArrivaClick operations serving nearby New Lubbesthorpe.
