= George Bull (disambiguation) =

George Bull (1634–1710) was an English bishop and theologian.

George Bull may also refer to:

== People ==
- George Bull (journalist) (1929–2001), English translator, author and journalist
- George Bull (cricketer), English cricketer
- George Stringer Bull (1799–1865), English cleric and activist
- Sir George Bull, 3rd Baronet (1906–1986), of the Bull baronets
- George Bull (priest), Dean of Connor
- George Bull (business) (1936–2024), last chairman of Grand Metropolitan, founding joint chairman of Diageo, and first non-family chairman of Sainsbury's

== Characters ==
- Sir George Bull, fictional character in the novels of Milward Kennedy
- Dr. George Bull, protagonist in Doctor Bull

== See also ==
- George Ball (disambiguation)
- Bull (surname)
