= George Grewcock =

English cricketer

George Grewcock (16 May 1862 – 15 August 1922) was an English cricketer active in 1899 who played for Leicestershire. He was born in Barwell and died in Liverpool. He appeared in three first-class matches as a lefthanded batsman who bowled left arm fast medium. He scored four runs with a highest score of one and took eight wickets with a best performance of four for 93.
