= George Bell (activist) =

American activist (c.1761–1843)

- Born: c. 1761; Virginia, U.S.
- Died: 1843 (aged 81–82); Washington, D.C., U.S.
- Occupation: Activist
- Known for: Advocacy of education for African Americans

George Bell (c. 1761–1843) was an American activist for the education rights of African Americans. In 1807, he co-founded the Bell School, the first school for African Americans in Washington, D.C.

== Early life ==
Bell was born into slavery in Virginia. His wife, Sophia Browning, purchased his freedom while she was also enslaved. Bell worked as a carpenter in Washington, D.C., and used his wages to purchase his wife's freedom.

== Education advocacy ==
Bell could not read or write. He believed that education should be accessible for African Americans and became an activist in this area. Bell co-founded and built a one-story school house with Nicholas Franklin and Moses Liverpool, two free African American men who were also formerly enslaved. Their school, the Bell School, was located in the Capitol Hill neighborhood. The original Bell School closed after few years due to a lack of funding. The school is considered Washington D.C.'s first school for African Americans.

Bell co-founded the Resolute Beneficial Society, a society that supported health, education, and burial needs of Washington, D.C.'s Black community. The society successfully re-opened the Bell School in 1818.

== Death ==
Bell died in Washington, D.C., in 1843.
