= Resolute Beneficial Society =

The Resolute Beneficial Society, established in 1818, was a Washington DC organization founded by free African Americans. The society supported health, education, and burial needs of Washington D.C.'s Black community.

== History ==
The Society was organized by George Bell, John W. Prout, John F. Cook, Sr., James Harris, Rev. Stepney Forrest and others.
