= George Ball (cricketer) =

English cricketer

George Armstrong Ball (27 February 1914 – 20 December 1997) was an English cricketer active from 1932 to 1936 who played for Leicestershire. He was born and died in Barwell. He appeared in eleven first-class matches as a righthanded batsman who scored 207 runs with a highest score of 44 not out.
