= George Bell (brigadier general) =

United States Army Brigadier General (1828–1907)

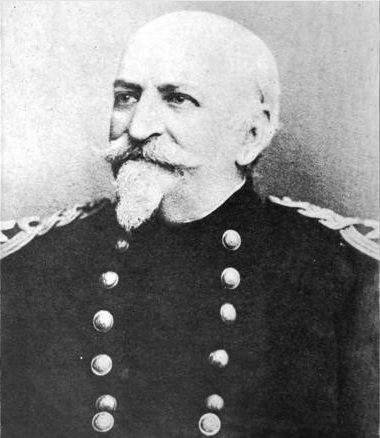
Brigadier General George Bell

George Bell (March 12, 1828 – January 2, 1907) was a United States Army Brigadier General. He was prominent as a subsistence and commissary officer in the Union Army during and after the American Civil War.

== Early life and start of military career ==
George Bell was born in Hagerstown, Maryland, on March 12, 1828. He graduated from the United States Military Academy in 1853 and was appointed a Second Lieutenant of Artillery.

Bell's initial assignments included postings to Fort Hamilton, Fort McIntosh, Fort Brown, Fort McHenry and Fort Clark. He took part in action during the Third Seminole War in Florida in the mid-1850s.

== Civil War ==
Initially assigned as a general's aide in Texas at the start of the Civil War, Bell transferred to the Maryland area and was assigned as Quartermaster in Annapolis. From 1861 until 1865 he continued to serve in logistics positions, including: Officer in Charge of the depot at Alexandria, Virginia, and Instructor of Commissaries; Assistant Commissary, Army of the Potomac; Chief Commissary, Department of the Susquehanna; and Officer in Charge of the depot at Washington, D.C.. During the war Bell received brevet promotions to Major, Lieutenant Colonel, Colonel and Brigadier General.

== Post Civil War ==
From October, 1865 to March, 1869 Bell was Chief Commissary of the Department of Washington, D.C. He continued to serve in Chief Commissary assignments for the rest of his career, including: Department of the South, Atlanta; Department of the Ohio, Cincinnati; Department of the Missouri, Fort Leavenworth, Kansas; and Department of the East, New York City.

== Retirement and death ==
Bell retired with the permanent rank of Colonel in 1892. In retirement he resided in Washington, D.C. In 1904 Bell was promoted to Brigadier General on the retired list.

He died in Washington on January 2, 1907, and was buried in Hagerstown's Rose Hill Cemetery.

== Family ==
In 1858 Bell married in San Antonio, Texas Isabella McCormick of Washington, D.C. They had seven sons and one daughter. Two sons attended West Point, including Major General George Bell Jr.
