= George Gray Bell =

Canadian general (1920–2000)

- Born: May 24, 1920; Toronto, Ontario, Canada
- Died: October 15, 2000 (aged 80) Toronto, Ontario
- Allegiance: British Empire
- Branch: Canadian Army
- Service years: 1940–1972
- Rank: Brigadier-General
- Conflicts: World War II
- Awards: O.C., M.B.E., C.D. CD,
- Other work: Civil servant, and academic

George Gray Bell, OC MBE CD (May 24, 1920 – October 15, 2000) was a Canadian soldier, civil servant, and academic.

== Education ==
Born in Toronto, Ontario, he joined the Canadian Army in 1940 and graduated from the Royal Military College of Canada in 1943.

== Career ==
He served in the Royal Canadian Armoured Corps in the Netherlands and Germany. After World War II, he remained in the army serving in different positions eventually becoming a Brigadier-General. In 1972, he received a Ph.D. in International Relations from McGill University. In 1973, he became Assistant Deputy Minister to the Minister of the Treasury, Economics and Intergovernmental Affairs in the Government of Ontario. In 1976, he became Executive Vice-president and Professor of Strategic Studies at York University. He helped found and was the first President of the Canadian Institute of Strategic Studies. He was a founding director of the Canadian Institute for International Peace and Security (CIIPS) from 1984 until its dissolution in 1987.

After his retirement, he was the Honorary President of the RCAC Association. He was a senior research fellow at York University until 1996.

In 1988, he was awarded the Officer of the Order of Canada "An outstanding citizen, he has served Canada well throughout a long military career, a continuing connection with public life and the academe... [H]e has made major contributions to many organizations with the primary aim of preserving the security of Canada."

He was Honorary Colonel, Royal Canadian Dragoons. He died in Toronto, Ontario on October 15, 2000.

== Legacy ==
The Canadian International Council awards the Brigadier-General George G. Bell Strategic Leadership Shield in recognition of the qualities of outstanding intellectual leadership, inspiration in strategic studies and promoting public awareness of international security interests. The Canadian International Council holds the George G. Bell Strategic Leadership Award Dinner.

The George Gray Bell fonds at York University (1964–92) consists of records documenting his career, minutes of meetings, correspondence, working papers, reports, and reference and research materials.
