= Frederick S. Strong =

American soldier (1855–1935)

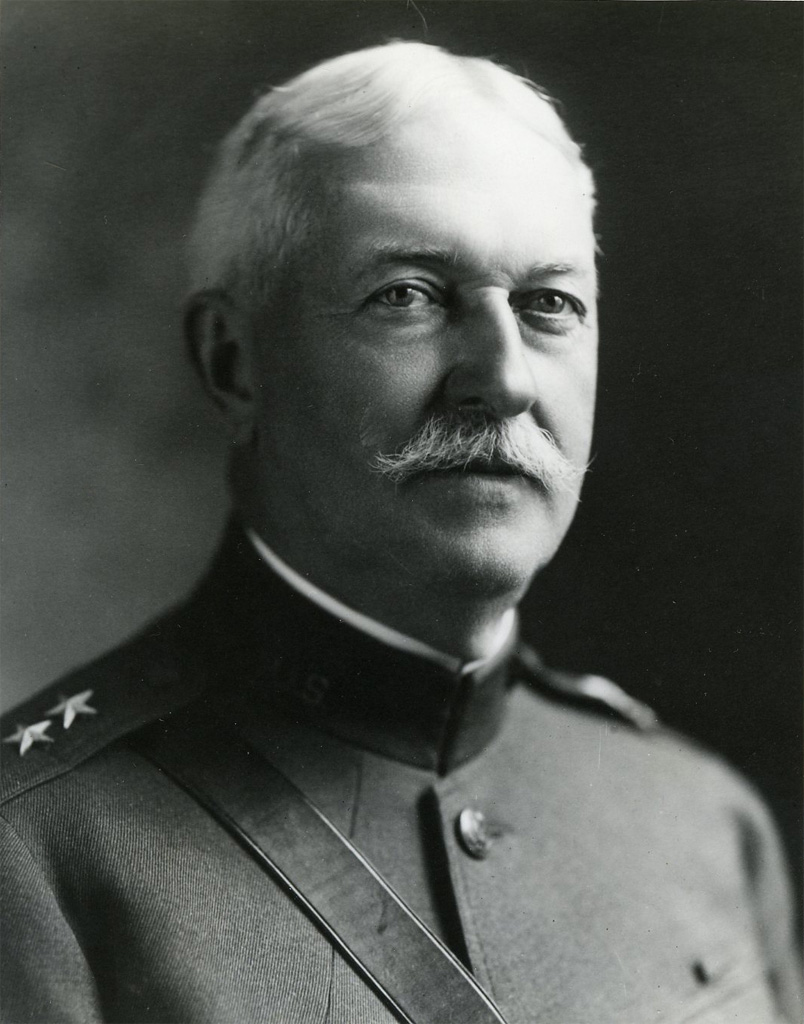
- Strong as commander of the 40th Division in 1918
- Born: November 12, 1855; Paw Paw, Michigan, US
- Died: March 9, 1935 (aged 79); San Diego, California, US
- Burial place: Arlington National Cemetery
- Spouse: Alice Marion Johnson (m. 1883–1935, his death)
- Children: 1
- Military career
- Allegiance: United States
- Branch: United States Army
- Service years: 1880–1919
- Rank: Major General
- Units: U.S. Army Field Artillery Branch; U.S. Army Coast Artillery Corps
- Commands: Michigan Military Academy; Coast Defenses of Eastern New York; U.S. Army Coast Artillery School; Coast Defenses of Chesapeake Bay; South Atlantic Coast Artillery District; Schofield Barracks; Hawaiian Department; 40th Division; Camp Jackson; Camp Kearny; South Pacific Coast Artillery District
- Conflicts: American Indian Wars; Spanish–American War; World War I

Frederick S. Strong (November 12, 1855 – March 9, 1935) was a career officer in the United States Army. He attained the rank of major general, and was a veteran of the American Indian Wars, Spanish–American War, and World War I. Strong was best known for his command of the Hawaiian Department from 1916 to 1917 and the 40th Division during World War I.

A native of Paw Paw, Michigan, Strong graduated from Kalamazoo High School in 1876 and the United States Military Academy at West Point in 1880. Commissioned as a second lieutenant in the 4th Field Artillery Regiment, Strong served on the West Point faculty, in Field Artillery postings throughout the western United States, and on the faculty of Michigan Military Academy. During the Spanish–American War he was assigned as assistant adjutant of 1st Division, Second Army Corps and served at Camp Mackenzie near Augusta, Georgia.

After the war, Strong served as superintendent of Michigan Military Academy and performed duty in the Philippines. He later commanded the Coast Defenses of Eastern New York, followed by command of the Coast Artillery School at Fort Monroe, Virginia and the Coast Defenses of Chesapeake Bay. In the years immediately prior to World War I, he commanded the South Atlantic Coast Artillery District in Charleston, South Carolina, Schofield Barracks, Hawaii, and the Hawaiian Department. During World War I, Strong commanded the 40th Division in France, where it served as a depot division and provided replacement soldiers to units in combat. After the war, he commanded Camp Jackson, South Carolina, Camp Kearny, California, and the South Pacific Coast Artillery District.

Strong retired in August 1919. In retirement, he resided in San Diego. He died on March 9, 1935, and was buried at Arlington National Cemetery.

== Early life ==
Frederick Smith Strong was born in Paw Paw, Michigan, on November 12, 1855, the son of Samuel Filer Strong and Anna Maria Fish. He graduated from Kalamazoo High School in 1876 and then began attendance at the United States Military Academy. He graduated in 1880 ranked 11th of 51. He received his commission as a second lieutenant in the 4th Field Artillery Regiment.

== Start of career ==
After graduating from West Point, Strong remained on the school's faculty during the summer and fall of 1880 as an assistant instructor of tactics. In December 1880 he joined his regiment in California, and performed duty at Fort Point and Fort Alcatraz. In June 1881, Strong was transferred to Fort Canby in Washington state. In September 1881, he was assigned to duty at Fort Stevens, Oregon, and he transferred to Madison Barracks, New York in October 1881.

In April 1882, Strong was assigned to Fort Monroe, Virginia, for attendance at the Artillery School. He graduated in April 1884 and was assigned as professor of military science and tactics at Michigan Military Academy, where he remained until September 1888. In September 1887, he was promoted to first lieutenant. After an extended leave, in July 1889 he was assigned to duty at Fort McPherson, Georgia. He remained there until September 1889, when he transferred to Fort Riley, Kansas.

While at Fort Riley, Strong served with the 4th Field Artillery's Light Battery B until October 1891. He took part in an American Indian Wars campaign in 1890–1891 as the commander of a mounted artillery battery that performed duty with the 1st Cavalry Regiment. From October 1891 to May 1892, Strong was again on duty at Fort McPherson. He was then assigned to a second tour of duty as a professor of military science at Michigan Military Academy, where he remained until September 1895. From October 1895 to May 1898, Strong was assigned as adjutant of the 4th Field Artillery at Washington Barracks, in Washington, D.C.

== Continued career ==
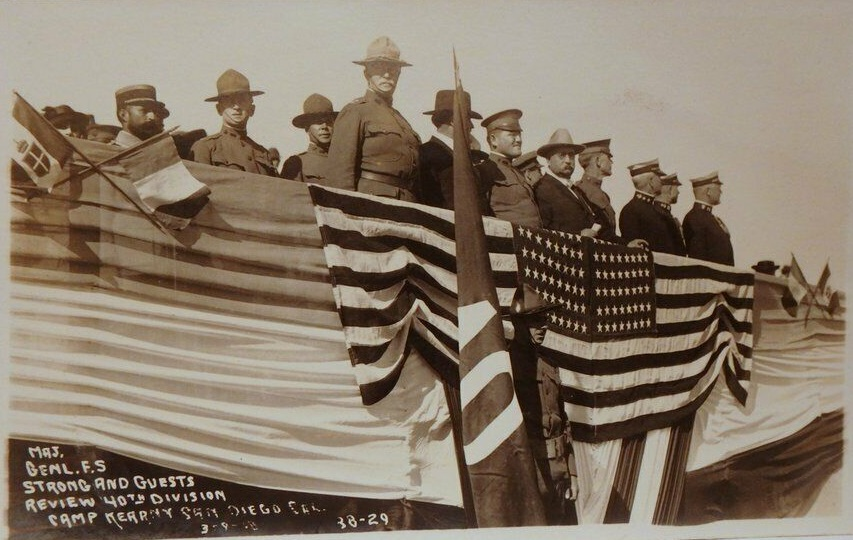
Strong and guests review 40th Division troops, March 1918

In May 1898, Strong was promoted to temporary major of United States Volunteers for the Spanish–American War. He was assigned as assistant adjutant of 1st Division, Second Army Corps. He performed duty at Camp Mackenzie near Augusta, Georgia, and remained in the Volunteers until being discharged on March 31, 1899. On March 2, 1899, he was promoted to the permanent rank of captain.

From 1899 to 1902, Strong was stationed at Fort Monroe as adjutant of the 4th Artillery, the Artillery School and Artillery District of the Chesapeake. From January 1902 to September 1904 Strong served as superintendent of Michigan Military Academy. Strong served as acting inspector general of the Field Artillery branch and school from September 1904 to July 1907, first in Washington, D.C. and then at Fort Monroe. He was promoted to major in November 1904.

Strong was promoted to lieutenant colonel of Coast Artillery in July 1907 and assigned as adjutant of the Department of the Lakes, where he served until May 1, 1909. From May 1909 to March 1911, Strong served in the Philippines as adjutant of the Department of Luzon. He was promoted to colonel in March 1911 and assigned to Fort Totten, New York as commander of the Coast Defenses of Eastern New York. In August, 1911 he was assigned to command of the Coast Artillery School and the Coast Defenses of Chesapeake Bay.

From September 1911 to November 1915, Strong was posted to Charleston, South Carolina, as commander of the South Atlantic Coast Artillery District. He was promoted to brigadier general in May 1915. From December 1915 to November 1916, Strong commanded Schofield Barracks, Hawaii. He was commander of the Hawaiian Department from November 1916 to July 1917.

== World War I ==
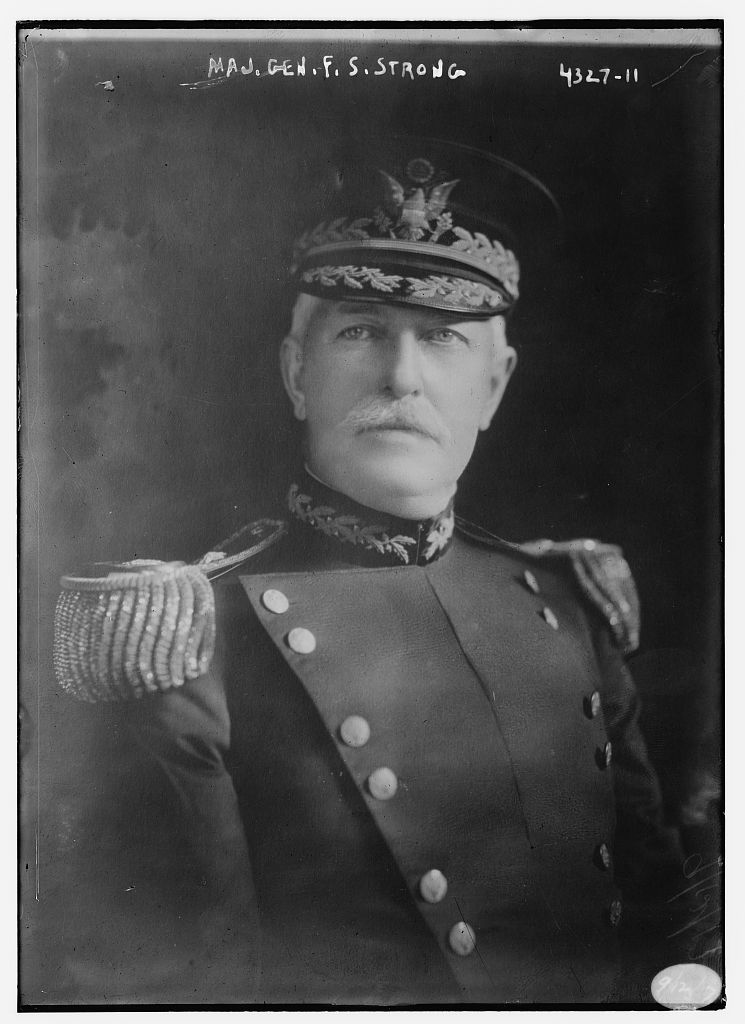
Strong as commander of the 40th Division, circa 1917

In August, four months after the American entry into World War I, Strong was promoted to temporary major general and assigned to command of the 40th Division, a recently created National Guard formation, during its organization and training at Camp Kearny, California. By the time the division arrived in France in August 1918, the War Department had decided to use newly-arrived divisions to provide replacement troops for other units already in combat, and Strong commanded the 40th Division as a depot division based in Revigny-sur-Ornain.

After the armistice with Germany ended the war in November 1918, Strong remained in command while the division moved to Castres-Gironde and awaited transportation to the United States. The 40th Division arrived in the United States on March 3, 1919, and proceeded to Camp Kearny, where it was demobilized on April 20, 1919.

== Post-World War I ==
After returning to the United States after World War I, Strong commanded Camp Jackson, South Carolina from March to April 1919. He was commander of the post at Camp Kearny from April to July 1919. In June, he returned to his permanent rank of brigadier general. From July to August 1919, Strong was commander of the South Pacific Coast Artillery District.

== Retirement and death ==
Strong would have reached the mandatory retirement age of 64 in November 1919. In August 1919, he requested early retirement, which was approved, and he settled in San Diego. In June 1930, Congress passed legislation allowing World War I general officers to retire at the highest rank they had held, and Strong was advanced to major general on the retired list.

From 1933 to 1934, Strong served on California's Relief Commission, an entity created to administer social welfare programs during the Great Depression. Strong died in San Diego on March 9, 1935. He is buried at Arlington National Cemetery.

== Legacy ==
Battery Strong, a Coast Artillery firing position at Fort Rosecrans, California was named for Strong. It operated from 1937 until it was deactivated in 1946. The site of Battery Strong is now part of the Naval Supply Center (NSC) San Diego Annex at Naval Base Point Loma. There are some remaining traces of the battery, but the location is not open to the public.

== Family ==
In 1883, Strong married Alice Marion Johnson (1863–1936). They were the parents of Frederick William Strong Jr. (1887–1986). The younger Strong graduated at the top of the West Point class of 1910, served in the Army, and later pursued a business career in Detroit. He attained the rank of brigadier general before retiring from the military in 1946.

== Sources ==
=== Internet ===
- Thayer, Bill (May 5, 2015). "Frederick Smith Strong in Biographical Register of the Officers and Graduates of the United States Military Academy". Bill Thayer's Web Site. Chicago, IL: Bill Thayer.
- Thompson, Erwin N. (1991). Overton, Howard B. (ed.). "Chapter 6: Modernization, 1936–1941". The Guns of San Diego: Historic Resource Study. San Diego, CA: National Park Service.

=== Newspapers ===
- "Obituary, Maj. Gen. Frederick S. Strong". Detroit Free Press. Detroit, MI. March 11, 1935. p. 9 – via Newspapers.com.

=== Books ===
- Davis, Henry Blaine Jr. (1998). Generals in Khaki. Raleigh, NC: Pentland Press. p. 351. ISBN 978-1-5719-7088-6 – via Google Books.
- Dwight, Benjamin Woodbridge (1871). The History of the Descendants of Elder John Strong. Vol. 2. Albany, NY: Joel Munsell. p. 825 – via Google Books.
- U.S. Civil Service Commission (1902). Eighteenth Report. p. 146 – via Google Books.
- United States Secretary of War (1910). Annual Reports. Vol. III. Washington, DC: US Government Printing Office. p. 205 – via Google Books.

=== Magazines ===
- Child, Paul W., ed. (April 1988). "Obituary, Frederick Smith Strong, Jr". Assembly. West Point, NY: Association of Graduates of the United States Military Academy. p. 167 – via Google Books.
