= John Loomis Chamberlain =

American army officer

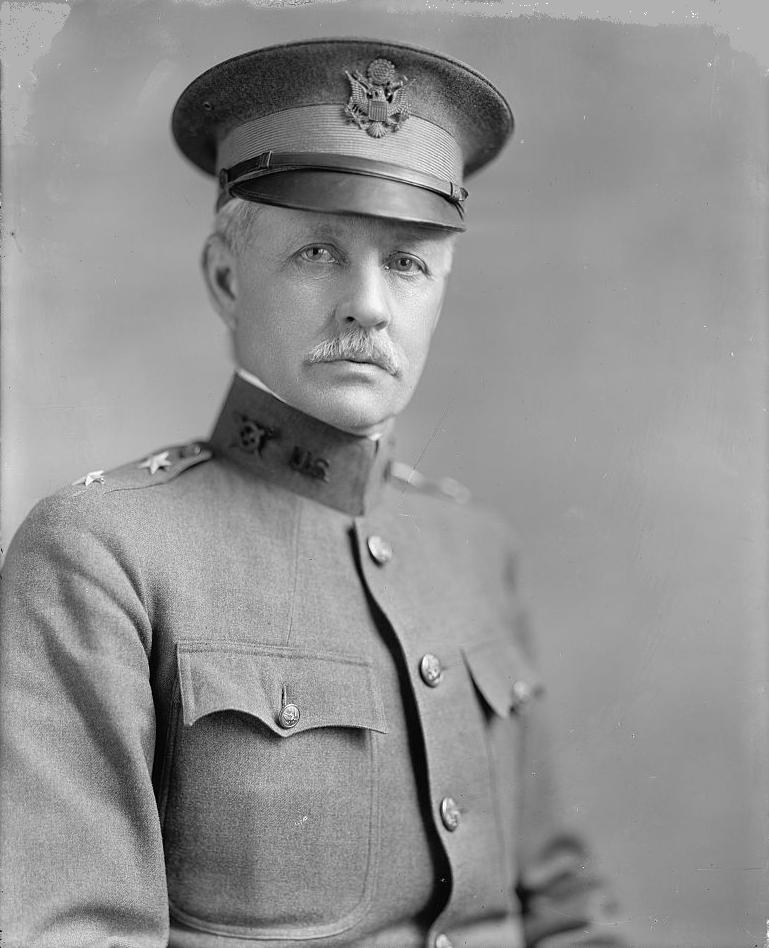
- John L. Chamberlain
- Born: January 20, 1858; South Livonia, New York, U.S.
- Died: November 14, 1948 (aged 90); Washington, D.C.
- Burial place: Arlington National Cemetery
- Spouse: Carolyn Marrow (m. 1896)
- Children: 2
- Military career
- Allegiance: United States
- Branch: United States Army
- Service years: 1880–1921
- Rank: Major General
- Service number: 0-9
- Commands: Inspector General of the U. S. Army
- Conflicts: American Indian Wars; Ghost Dance War; Spanish–American War; Philippine–American War; World War I; Occupation of the Rhineland
- Awards: Army Distinguished Service Medal

John Loomis Chamberlain (January 20, 1858 – November 14, 1948) was career officer in the United States Army. A veteran of the American Indian Wars, Spanish–American War, Philippine–American War, and World War I, he attained the rank of major general and was most notable for his service as Inspector General of the United States Army from 1917 to 1921.

== Early life ==
Chamberlain (Note: Chamberlain changed his name from "Chamberlin" to "Chamberlain" in 1896.) was born in South Livonia, New York on January 20, 1858, the son of Jabez L. Chamberlin and Charity (Hart) Chamberlin. He was educated at District School Number 10 in South Livonia, then attended the Geneseo Normal School (now the State University of New York at Geneseo). In 1876, he competed for appointment to the United States Military Academy. He was rated as the most qualified applicant, received the appointment, and began attendance at the academy in September 1876. He graduated in 1880 ranked fifth of 52 and received his commission as a second lieutenant of Field Artillery.

== Start of career ==
Chamberlain was assigned to the 1st Artillery Regiment and assigned to Fort Columbus, New York, where he served from September 1880 to November 1881. He served at Fort Alcatraz, California from November 1881 to December 1882, when he began attendance at the Willets Point, New York Torpedo School. (Note: Torpedoes were underwater mines used for harbor defense.) Chamberlain served again at Fort Alcatraz from June to October 1883, then was posted to the Presidio of San Francisco, where he remained until July 1884. In August 1884, Chamberlain was assigned to the faculty of the United States Military Academy as assistant professor of chemistry, mineralogy, and geology, and he held this position until August 1888. He was also an instructor of Cavalry tactics from December 1884 to August 1885, and instructor of Infantry tactics from August 1885 to February 1889. He received promotion to first lieutenant in August 1887.

From September 1888 to July 1890, Chamberlain was a student at the Fort Monroe, Virginia Field Artillery School. He was then assigned to the Washington Navy Yard, where John T. Thompson and he studied and experimented with artillery design and construction. Chamberlain carried out this duty until the end of March 1892, except for temporary duty during the Ghost Dance War with Light Battery E, 1st Artillery, at the Pine Ridge Indian Reservation in South Dakota in January 1891.

From April 1892 to August 1893, Chamberlain served as chief ordnance officer for the Department of Missouri. He was posted to Fort Wadsworth, New York with the 1st Artillery from August 1893 to January 1895. Chamberlain was instructor of military science and tactics at Peekskill Military Academy in Peekskill, New York from January 1895 to July 1896. He was then assigned to Battery D, 1st Artillery and served at Fort Sheridan, Illinois and Washington Barracks, District of Columbia from October 1896 to July 1897. Chamberlain served as U.S. military attaché in Vienna, Austria from August 1897 to May 1898.

== Continued career ==
During the Spanish–American War, Chamberlain returned to the United States and performed recruiting in New York City from June to July 1898. In July, he was promoted to temporary major and assigned as adjutant and ordnance officer for the Siege Artillery Train organized in Tampa, Florida and intended for service in Cuba. In August, he was assigned as chief ordnance officer of 1st Division, Seventh Army Corps, in addition to performing duty as the corps' chief mustering officer from August to October 1898. He was assigned as division adjutant in September, and served until the end of October. Chamberlain became ill during the autumn of 1898, and recuperated while on sick leave from October 1898 to February 1899.

In March 1899, Chamberlain was promoted to permanent captain in the 1st Artillery and assigned as adjutant of the 1st Artillery. He served in this post until November 1900, when he was promoted to permanent major and assigned to Inspector General duties in the Washington, D.C. Office of the Inspector General. He was promoted to lieutenant colonel in March 1901, and in April was appointed inspector general of the Department of California. In December 1902, he was assigned to Philippine–American War duty as inspector general of the Department of Mindanao. From June 1903 to January 1905, Chamberlain was inspector general of the Philippine Division, and he was promoted to colonel in November 1904.

Chamberlain served in the Office of the Inspector General from April 1905 to December 1906. He was assigned as inspector general of the Pacific Division from December 1906 to June 1907. From August 1907 to July 1909, he served as inspector general of the Department of the East. From September 1909 to August 1911, he served again as inspector general of the Philippines Division. He was inspector general of the Western Department from September 1911 to August 1912. From January to March 1912, Chamberlain attended a special course at the Fort Leavenworth, Kansas School of the Line (now the United States Army Command and General Staff College.

== Later career ==
Chamberlain was a student at the United States Army War College from September 1912 to June 1913. He served as inspector general of the Western Department from June 1913 to September 1914. From September 1914 to February 1917, Chamberlain was inspector general of the Eastern Department. Chamberlain was promoted to temporary brigadier general in February 1917 and assigned as Inspector General of the United States Army. He served throughout World War I and was promoted to temporary major general in October 1917. From July to September 1918, Chamberlain was in France to inspect the American Expeditionary Forces.

From June to October 1920, Chamberlain served in Europe, where he performed post-war inspector general duties for American Forces in Germany, graves registration, and other activities within the purview of the United States Department of War. He reverted to his permanent rank of colonel in February 1921, but was promoted to major general again in March. From July to November 1921, Chamberlain was on an extended leave of absence while he conducted observation tours of several countries on behalf of the War Department, including all of the Balkan States, Turkey, Syria, Palestine, and Egypt. In November 1921, Chamberlain requested retirement, which was approved, and he left the military shortly before reaching the mandatory retirement age of 64.

== Awards and honors ==
He was awarded the Army Distinguished Service Medal, the citation for which reads:

The President of the United States of America, authorized by Act of Congress, July 9, 1918, takes pleasure in presenting the Army Distinguished Service Medal to Major General John Loomis Chamberlain, United States Army, for exceptionally meritorious and distinguished services to the Government of the United States, in a duty of great responsibility during World War I. As Inspector General of the Army, General Chamberlain has contributed to the efficiency of all departments and bureaus of the Military Establishment and to the successful execution of the military program.

He also received the following medals:

- Indian Campaign Medal
- Spanish War Service Medal
- Philippine Campaign Medal
- Mexican Border Service Medal
- World War I Victory Medal

== Later life and death ==
In retirement, Chamberlain was a resident of Washington, D.C. He died in Washington on November 14, 1948. At the time of his death, he was the oldest living graduate of the United States Military Academy. Chamberlain was buried at Arlington National Cemetery.

== Family ==
In 1896, Chamberlain married Carolyn Marrow in Narragansett Pier, Rhode Island. They were the parents of two children, army officer John L. Chamberlain Jr. and Carolyn Chamberlain, the wife of Frederick M. Bradley.

== Notes ==
Military offices
Preceded by Ernest Albert Garlington	Inspector General of the U. S. Army; February 21, 1917 – November 6, 1921	Succeeded by Eli Alva Helmick
