= James Brailsford Erwin =

United States Army general

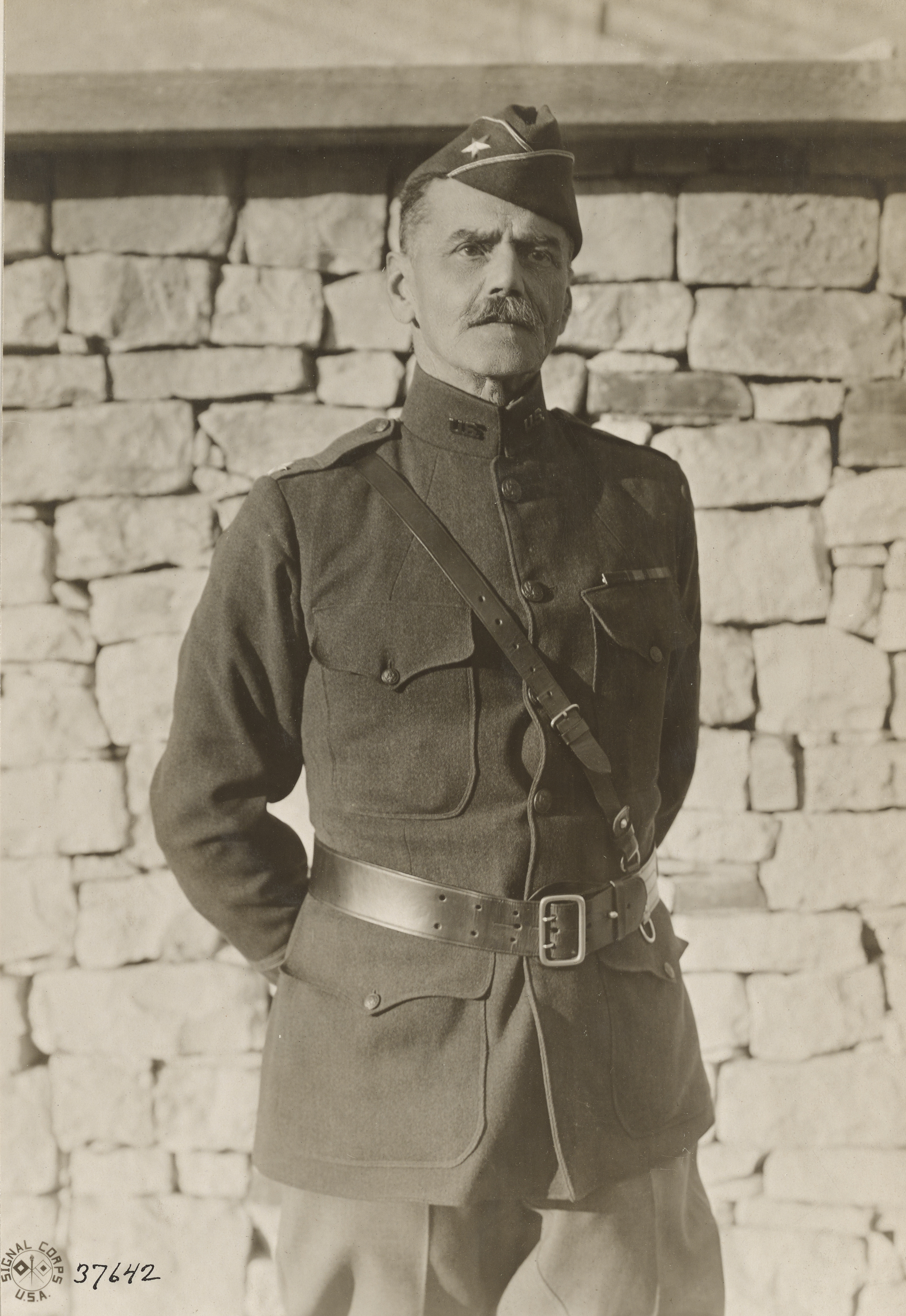
- Born: July 11, 1856; Savannah, Georgia, United States
- Died: July 10, 1924 (aged 67); Pasadena, California, United States
- Military career
- Allegiance: United States
- Branch: United States Army
- Service years: 1880–1920
- Rank: Brigadier General
- Unit: Cavalry Branch
- Commands: 6th Division; 12th Infantry Brigade
- Conflicts: American Indian Wars; Philippine–American War; Pancho Villa Expedition; World War I
- Awards: Army Distinguished Service Medal; Croix de Guerre (France)

Brigadier General James Brailsford Erwin (July 11, 1856 − July 10, 1924) was a United States Army officer who served in the American Indian Wars, the Philippine–American War from 1899 to 1902, the Pancho Villa Expedition from 1915 to 1916 and briefly led the 6th Division towards the end of World War I in 1918.

== Military career ==
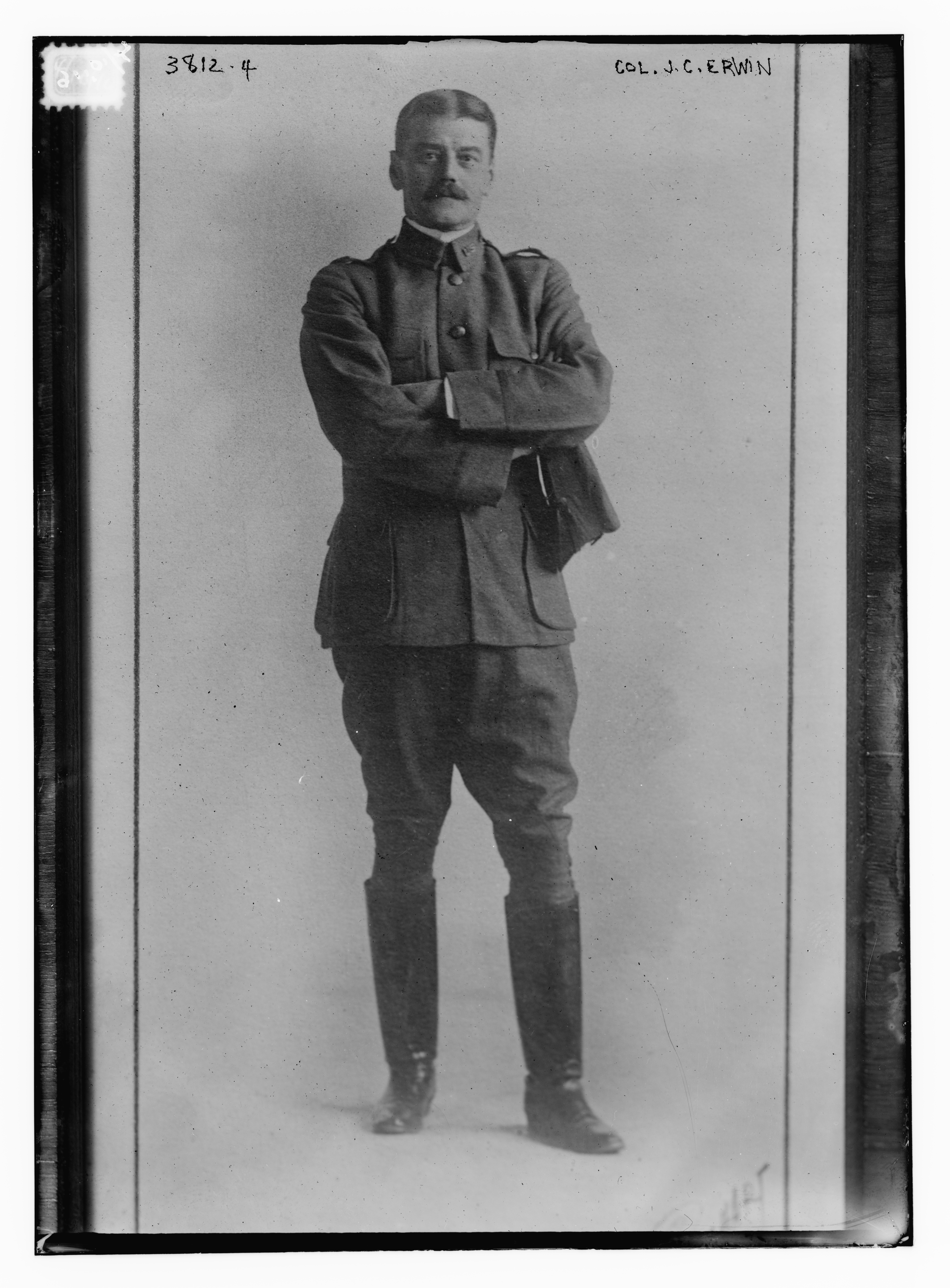
Erwin as a colonel, circa 1917. Bain Collection, Library of Congress.

He was born on July 11, 1856, in Savannah, Georgia, to Robert Erwin and Mary Ann Gallaudet. He attended Trinity College in Hartford, Connecticut. He graduated, 22nd in a class of 52, from the United States Military Academy in 1880 with the rank of second lieutenant and was assigned to the 4th Cavalry at Fort Hayes, where he served in the American Indian Wars. He married Isabel Doan of St. Louis, Missouri.

From 1897 to 1899 he served as the commanding officer of Fort Yellowstone and the Acting Superintendent of Yellowstone National Park. He served in the Philippine–American War from 1899 to 1902. During the 1906 San Francisco earthquake he was in charge of the relief effort. He then served in the Pancho Villa Expedition from 1915 to 1916 and led the 6th Infantry Division during World War I.

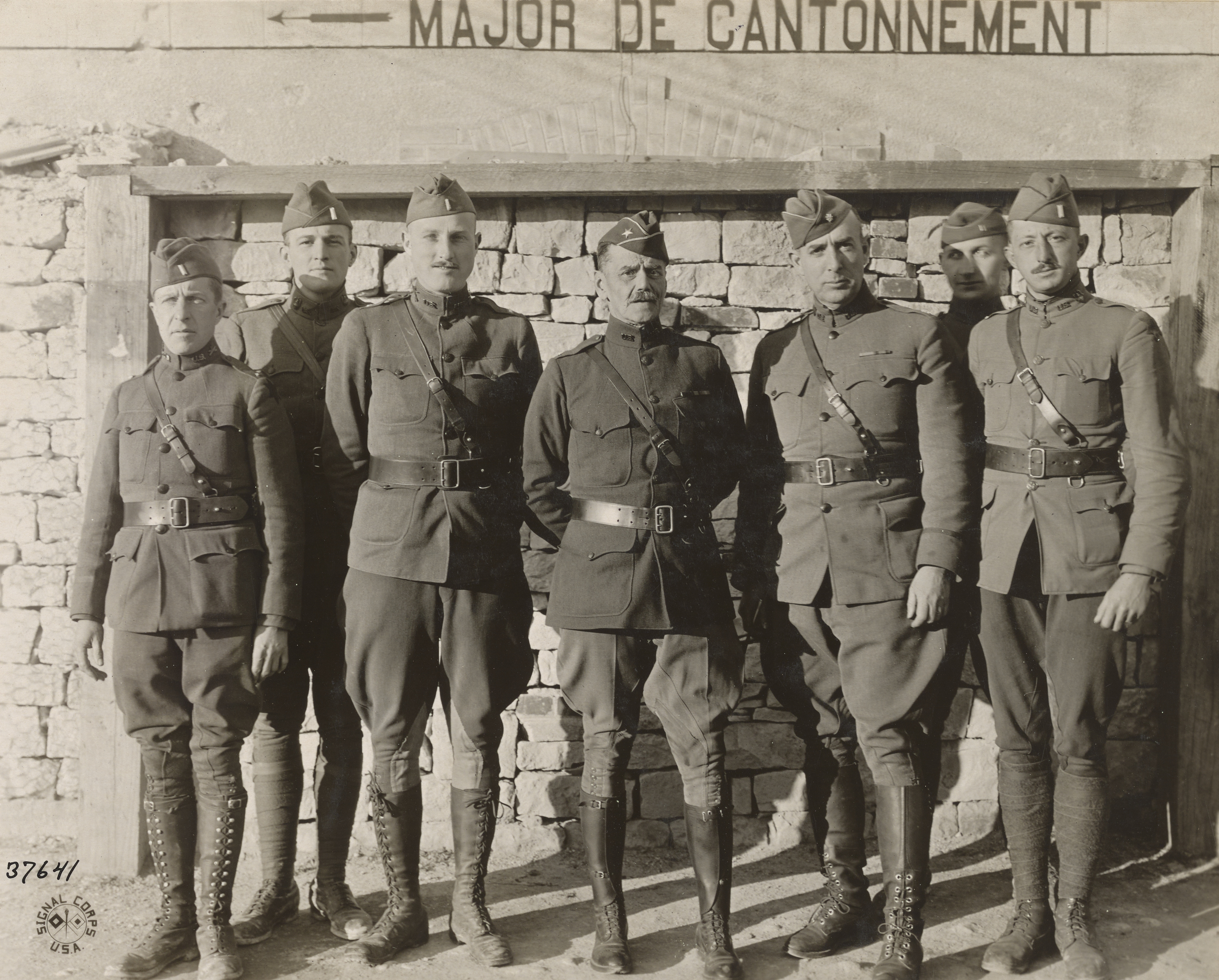
Brigadier General James B. Erwin, commander of the 12th Brigade, 6th Division, together with members of his brigade staff, pictured here near Verdun, France, November 21, 1918.

He was awarded the Army Distinguished Service Medal, the citation for which reads:

The President of the United States of America, authorized by Act of Congress, July 9, 1918, takes pride in presenting the Army Distinguished Service Medal (Posthumously) to Brigadier General James Brailsford Erwin, United States Army, for exceptionally meritorious and distinguished services to the Government of the United States, in a duty of great responsibility during World War I. With sound technical skill, initiative, and untiring energy, General Erwin assisted in the organization and training of the 6th Division, and commanded with distinction the 12th Infantry Brigade during its operations in the Vosges sector, and during the Meuse-Argonne offensive, 1 to 11 November 1918. His rare quality of leadership and unremitting devotion to duty were material factors in the successful operations of his division, contributing markedly to the accomplishments of the American Expeditionary Forces in Europe.

After returning to the United States, he retired from the army on July 11, 1920. He died on July 10, 1924, in Pasadena, California, a day before his 68th birthday. He was buried at Calvary Cemetery and Mausoleum in Saint Louis, Missouri.

Military offices
Preceded by Newly activated organization	Commanding General 6th Division; 1917−1918	Succeeded by Walter Henry Gordon
