= Gustavus Fowke =

English army officer and cricketer

Personal information
- Full name: Gustavus Henry Spencer Fowke
- Born: 14 October 1880; Brighton, Sussex, England
- Died: 24 June 1946 (aged 65); Wansford, Northamptonshire, England
- Batting: Right-handed
- Bowling: Right-arm fast-medium
- Role: Batsman

Domestic team information
- Years: Team
- 1899–1927: Leicestershire
- FC debut: 7 August 1899 Leicestershire v Essex
- Last FC: 30 August 1927 Leicestershire v Lancashire

Career statistics
Competition	First-class
Matches	160
Runs scored	4,438
Batting average	18.96
100s/50s	2/19
Top score	113
Balls bowled	1,114
Wickets	13
Bowling average	56.76
5 wickets in innings	0
10 wickets in match	0
Best bowling	2/13
Catches/stumpings	89/–
- Source: CricketArchive, 11 September 2013

Gustavus Henry Spencer Fowke (14 October 1880 – 24 June 1946) was an English army officer and also a first-class cricketer who played for Leicestershire and the Army between 1899 and 1927. He was born in Brighton, Sussex and died at Wansford, then in Northamptonshire, now in Cambridgeshire.

== Soldier and cricketer ==
Fowke was educated at Uppingham School and played his first senior cricket after leaving school in the summer of 1899: he appeared in four matches for Leicestershire and in the third of them, opening the batting, he scored 55 against Hampshire.

Fowke then joined the British Army and was recorded in October 1900 as "Trooper G. H. S. Fowke" as having been elevated temporarily to the rank of lieutenant in the 18th Battalion of the Imperial Yeomanry. The 18th Battalion was part of a unit nicknamed the "Sharpshooters" and they were deployed in the Boer War in South Africa from May 1900. Fowke was taken prisoner in March 1901, but released. Less than a year after his elevation, Fowke "relinquished" his commission in August 1901.

The war over, Fowke rejoined the Army as a lieutenant in the Gordon Highlanders: he is recorded as having been promoted from second lieutenant to full lieutenant in 1906. There was a further promotion to captain in 1911. Records are then absent until he retires from the army with the rank of major – a title he used for the rest of his life – in 1919 after the end of the First World War. He appears to have spent much of the war as a prisoner of war: he was posted as missing on 24 October 1914 and not repatriated until 18 November 1918.

Fowke's military career restricted his cricket opportunities. He appeared in minor matches for Punjab in 1903; and he reappeared for Leicestershire in matches in 1908 and 1911. One of his three matches in 1911 was against Derbyshire at Chesterfield when Aubrey Sharp made 216 in 250 minutes, and Fowke, who scored 67, helped him to put on 262 for the sixth wicket, which remained the Leicestershire record for this wicket until beaten by Phil Simmons and Paul Nixon in 1996. In 1913 his one first-class innings of the season, in the match between the Army and the Royal Navy, produced a score of 113 which would remain his highest.

== Cricket captaincy ==
At the age of 41 and retired from the Army, Fowke finally embarked on a full-time cricket career with Leicestershire in the 1922 season, having played, before the start of the season, just nine first-class games, four of them 23 years earlier. Leicestershire needed Fowke because of a problem with the captaincy: Aubrey Sharp had been chosen as captain in 1921 and re-appointed for 1922, but the demands of his career as a solicitor meant that he could appear in no more than five games; Fowke was initially picked as a stand-in and as the only available amateur, but then took over the captaincy officially when it became plain that Sharp was not able to resume. The captaincy may have come to him by default as an amateur, but Fowke proved to be worth his place in the team in 1922: he made 977 runs at an average of 23.20, his highest aggregate and average in any season. He did not score any centuries in 1922, but against Derbyshire he made 99 and against Glamorgan he scored 98, and Leicestershire won both games by a substantial margin. Wisden Cricketers' Almanack noted that Fowke was "one of the most dependable batsmen on the side" and credited him with improving the fielding of the team, though it added that Leicestershire "became too fond of stopping the ball with the feet, a tendency due, no doubt, to several of the team being over forty years of age".

Fowke was one of those over-40s, but was in fact only at the start of his cricket career, and he remained as Leicestershire's captain for the next five seasons, overseeing a transition in the team that saw the retirement of older players such as John King, Samuel Coe and Arthur Mounteney and the introduction of the nucleus of the team of the 1930s with Les Berry, Norman Armstrong, Haydon Smith and Alan Shipman. His own performances did not equal those of 1922, but nor did they fall much short: he made at least 500 runs in each season and his season average only once dipped below 15 runs per innings. His only century for Leicestershire was an innings of 104 in the match against Northamptonshire in 1923. In that match and in others until the emergence of Eddie Dawson, Berry and Shipman as regular opening batsmen, Fowke opened the innings, but later he dropped down the batting order to No 6 or No 7, and sometimes even lower. He missed a few matches in 1926 through a leg strain, but otherwise maintained fitness through to the end of the 1927 season, when he played in 29 first-class matches, more than in any other season, and then retired.

The transition in Leicestershire cricket during the years of Fowke's captaincy was not just in terms of playing personnel; the club, perennially one of the more precarious in terms of organisation and finances, put itself on a more secure footing in the mid-1920s, recruiting Ernie Hayes as its first professional coach, entering a second eleven in the Minor Counties Championship and expanding membership. Fowke's contribution was acknowledged with a special presentation at the club's golden jubilee gathering in 1928.
