= List of Nelson Cricket Club professionals =

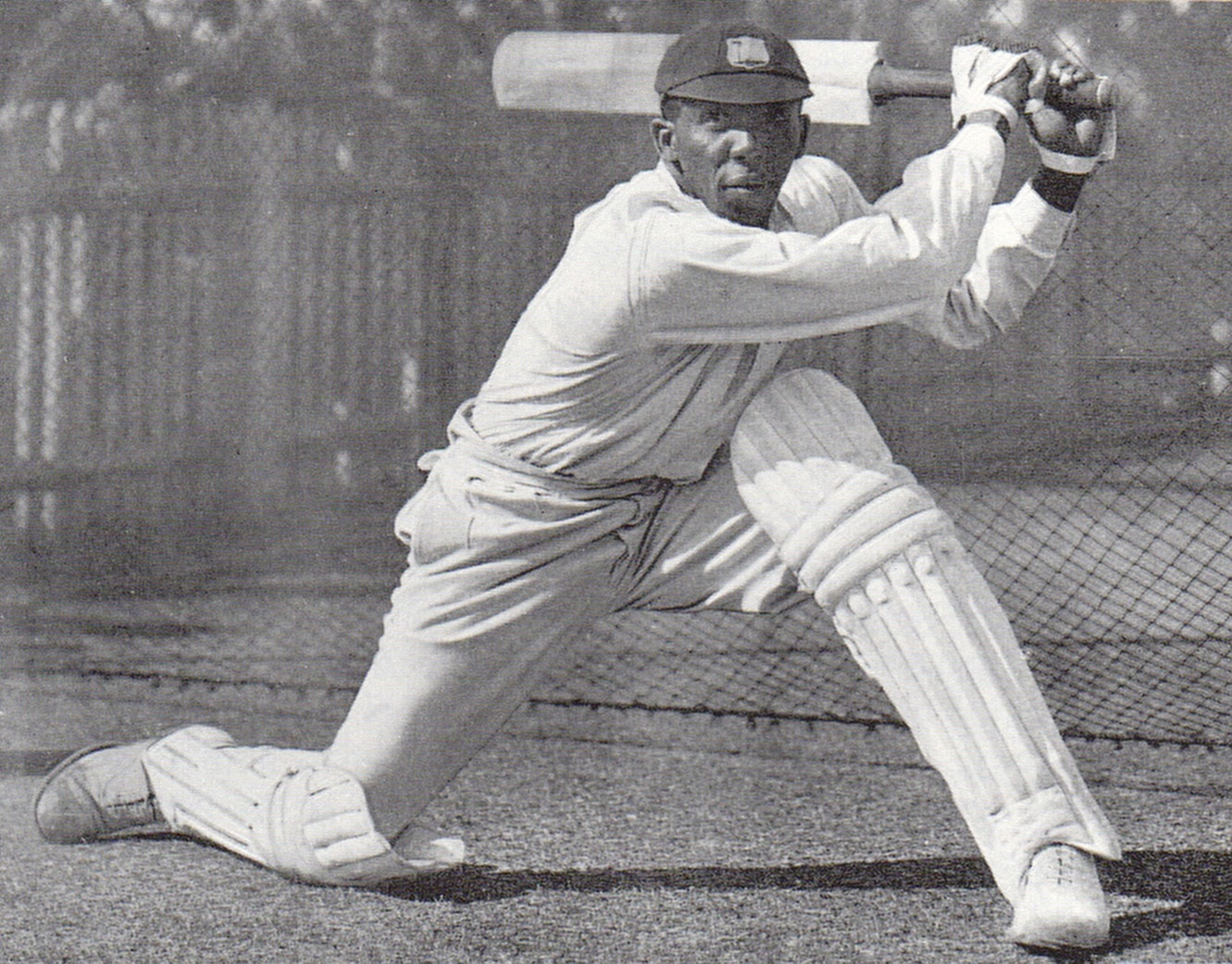
Learie Constantine was Nelson's professional between 1929 and 1937

Nelson Cricket Club is a semi-professional cricket club based in the town of Nelson, Lancashire, England. The club plays in the Lancashire League, and has done so since its formation in 1892. The Lancashire League requires that each club plays one professional in each match. Traditionally, clubs in the league have hired a number of international and first-class players. Nelson's first professionals, for the 1892 season, were England Test player, Willis Cuttell and Derbyshire bowler, John Hulme. In 1900, the league rules were amended so that only one professional could be appointed per season. Since then, a number of famous players have represented the club, including Learie Constantine, Kapil Dev and Steve Waugh. The then-current Australia spin-bowler Nathan Hauritz played for the team in the 2005 season.

As of 2011, former West Indies batsman Keith Arthurton has the highest batting average of all the professionals, attaining an average of 113.66 in 10 matches in the 2000 campaign. Fellow West Indian, Learie Constantine, achieved the highest individual score to date of 192 not out against East Lancashire on 2 August 1937. Australian Joe Scuderi, who played over 120 games for the team in 12 seasons, holds both the professional and amateur records for the most runs in a single season. In 1991, he broke the professional record, amassing 1,414 runs in his first year with Nelson. He went on to surpass the amateur tally in 2005, scoring 1,135 runs. So far, the only professional bowlers to have taken all 10 wickets in an innings were Constantine, who conceded only 10 runs in the process against Accrington on 12 May 1934, and South African medium-pacer Anthonie Ferreira, who achieved the feat against the same club on 25 June 1988.

== Professionals ==
Name	Nationality	Years	Batting				Bowling/Fielding					
Name	Nationality	Years	M	RS	HS	BatA	O	RC	W	BowlA	BF	Ct
Willis Cuttell	England	1892–1893	110	2265	97	24.61	1690.4	3808	378	10.07	8–29	54
John Hulme	England	1892; 1897–1898	58	1109	114	23.59	942.3	2040	252	8.09	8–40	23
Frank Shacklock	England	1893–1896	72	1165	98	19.41	1083.4	2737	277	9.88	8–77	31
Arthur Wilkinson	England	1894	21	212	34	14.13	177	314	29	10.82	6–24	16
W Muschamp	England	1895	23	87	27*	6.21	7.3	24	1	24.00	1–19	8
George Wood	England	1896–1897	43	727	75	18.64	4.1	27	0	—	—	21
RE Adams	England	1898–1899	45	617	59*	19.90	536	1587	124	12.79	7–6	16
Harry Riley	England	1898–1900	48	596	100	17.52	761.3	2132	194	10.98	8–45	6
Arthur Woodley	England	1901	26	118	24	8.42	425.5	1269	71	17.87	9–28	6
George Turnbull	England	1902–1906	123	2025	99	18.92	1988.3	4571	517	8.84	9–5	63
Frank Howard	England	1907	22	231	50	11.55	294.3	676	68	9.94	7–34	12
George Wilson	England	1908–1909	44	571	73*	15.43	686.4	1635	208	7.86	9–60	14
Billy Bestwick	England	1910	9	22	11	3.66	129.4	293	30	9.76	8–35	3
Albert Hallam	England	1911–1913	70	237	29	5.64	1191	2980	279	10.68	10–39	40
Henry Preston	England	1914	22	73	22*	5.61	401	1032	88	11.72	8–36	5
Bill Shipman	England	1915	22	417	72*	19.85	324.4	957	77	12.42	8–28	7
Percy Morfee	England	1919	27	433	86	20.61	372.2	1107	123	9.00	9–48	20
George Geary	England	1920–1921	49	556	42	12.08	752.5	1648	167	9.86	8–29	26
Ted McDonald	Australia	1922–1924	70	1108	69	16.29	973.1	2524	297	8.49	10–18	20
Jimmy Blanckenberg	South Africa	1925–1928	93	2586	143*	32.73	1442	3471	316	10.98	9–41	32
Learie Constantine	West Indies	1929–1937	225	6550	192*	37.21	3303.5	7913	799	9.90	10–10	133
Lala Amarnath	India	1938–1939	49	1072	115	29.77	903.2	1942	187	10.38	9–29	20
Albert Nutter	England	1945	13	296	84	29.60	189.3	397	43	9.23	10–13	0
Albert Hartley	England	1946–1948	71	1014	52*	28.16	1221.1	2430	204	11.91	7–29	34
Jack Pettiford	Australia	1949–1950	50	1726	100*	46.64	629	1833	124	14.78	7–22	22
Dattu Phadkar	India	1951; 1953–1954	59	1442	116	45.06	922.5	1992	187	10.65	8–21	15
Ray Lindwall	Australia	1952	25	480	78*	32.00	400.1	804	96	8.38	8–33	7
Geff Noblet	Australia	1955–1956	50	455	47	18.20	865.3	1643	157	10.46	9–29	19
Baloo Gupte	India	1957–1958	51	820	70	21.57	542.3	1657	125	13.25	7–25	8
Johnny Wardle	England	1959–1962	105	2392	124	26.87	1770.5	4428	368	12.03	9–70	53
Des Hoare	Australia	1963–1964	56	476	50	13.22	931.4	2154	191	11.27	9–14	23
Saeed Ahmed	Pakistan	1965–1966	57	1329	85*	28.89	1030.4	1907	197	9.68	9–18	21
Neil Hawke	Australia	1967; 1969–1970	85	1837	103*	34.01	1354.3	2551	297	8.58	9–18	50
Sadiq Mohammad	Pakistan	1968	27	843	94*	33.72	147.5	485	21	23.09	2–11	12
Goolam Abed	South Africa	1971	8	253	109	31.62	37.2	161	7	23.00	4–25	4
Sarfraz Nawaz	Pakistan	1972–1973	19	496	70*	38.15	323.5	616	64	9.62	8–30	10
Collis King	West Indies	1974–1976^{[A]}	23	713	125	35.65	320.3	759	54	14.05	7–33	11
Harold Gibson	West Indies	1976	24	504	52*	22.90	62.4	237	7	33.85	4–47	14
Larry Gomes	West Indies	1977–1978	20	836	115*	59.71	230.5	676	30	22.53	6–60	3
Stephen Howard	Australia	1979	11	163	65	18.11	117.1	346	9	38.44	4–60	4
Derek Parker	England	1980	10	79	30	7.90	143.5	455	18	25.27	5–62	3
Kapil Dev	India	1981	24	893	90	40.59	391.5	1097	73	15.02	6–47	8
Neal Radford	South Africa	1982	12	148	46	13.45	209.3	585	39	15.00	8–43	6
Graham Roope	England	1983	8	137	68*	22.83	90.2	356	13	27.38	4–67	8
Barry Wood	England	1984	4	111	57	27.75	78.5	245	10	24.50	5–48	1
Terry Hunte	Barbados	1984–1985	13	89	24	8.90	162.4	412	28	14.71	7–39	5
Eric Simons	South Africa	1986	18	600	75	50.00	270	799	47	17.00	7–45	10
Steve Waugh	Australia	1987	12	403	93	57.57	198.4	647	26	24.88	6–55	3
Anthonie Ferreira	South Africa	1988	12	349	108*	43.62	157.4	520	26	20.00	10–45	10
James Brayshaw	Australia	1989	11	565	135	56.50	121	413	19	21.73	3–27	10
Brendon Julian	Australia	1990	9	327	89	46.71	127.2	498	20	24.90	5–45	3
Joe Scuderi	Australia	1991–1996; 2002–2006; 2009^{[B]}	121	5688	155	61.16	1082.2	3223	212	15.20	8–31	55
Alan Dawson	South Africa	1997	7	195	100	32.50	88.3	311	9	34.55	3–80	2
Roger Harper	West Indies	1998–1999	17	754	86	68.54	304.1	569	60	9.48	9–24	13
Keith Arthurton	West Indies	2000	10	341	76*	113.66	69.1	162	12	13.50	3–26	6
Wade Wingfield	South Africa	2001	7	187	71	46.75	85	211	10	21.10	4–12	6
Cameron Cuffy	West Indies	2004	11	87	31	17.40	129.3	402	28	14.35	5–11	5
Nathan Hauritz	Australia	2005	24	846	121*	52.87	367.4	1141	67	17.03	6–44	5
Robin Peterson	South Africa	2006; 2009	34	1099	89*	40.70	383.1	1050	112	9.37	8–75	14
Craig McMillan	New Zealand	2007–2008	56	1533	149	46.45	552.4	1800	119	15.12	7–84	26
Burton de Wett	South Africa	2010	20	721	85*	51.50	195.4	729	48	15.20	6–55	7
Luke Woodcock	New Zealand	2011	10	325	82	36.11	137.4	515	33	15.61	6–49	6
Shahzaib Hasan	Pakistan	2012	11	288	55	26.18	164.3	537	28	19.17	7–68	1
Ryan Canning	South Africa	2013–2015	56	1887	106*	48.38	59.5	268	9	29.77	3–48	31
Keshav Maharaj	South Africa	2015	12	139	30	12.63	165.3	508	32	15.87	6–47	3
Ryan Bailey	South Africa	2016	19	618	126*	61.80	20	129	1	129.00	1–69	8
Devon Conway	New Zealand^{[C]}	2017	18	727	131*	55.92	59	315	7	45.00	3–44	9
Reeza Hendricks	South Africa	2018	11	281	106	31.22	109	416	22	18.90	5–31	7
Sanjika Ridma	Sri Lanka	2019	20	322	81*	21.46	203.1	534	41	13.02	6–22	2
Usman Tariq	Pakistan	2021–2023	68	3013	166*	53.80	745.3	2316	107	21.64	6–29	26

== Key ==
- Players in **bold** have played for their country in at least one Test match, One Day International or Twenty20 International.

Batting:

- M = Matches played
- RS = Runs scored
- HS = High score
- * = Not out
- BatA = Batting average

Bowling/Fielding:

- O = Overs bowled
- RC = Runs conceded
- W = Wickets taken
- BowlA = Bowling average
- BF = Best figures
- Ct = Catches

== Footnotes ==
A.: The list of Nelson professionals says that King played for Nelson between 1974 and 1975, however CricketArchive shows that he played for the club in the 1976 season.
B.: Scuderi played for Nelson as professional from 1991–1996 and 2002–2003, but also played as an amateur in the 2004 and 2005 seasons as well as playing one match in both the 2006 and 2009 seasons.
C.: Devon Conway held South African citizenship during his time at Nelson; however, he later went on to represent New Zealand in international cricket.
