= Shipman =

Shipman may refer to:

== People ==
- Abraham Shipman (died 1664), English governor of Bombay
- Alan Shipman (1901–1979), English cricketer
- Barry Shipman (1912-1994), American screenwriter
- Bill Shipman (1886–1943), English cricketer
- Claire Shipman, American television correspondent
- David Shipman (colonist) (1730–1813), American colonist
- David Shipman (writer) (1932–1996), British film critic and writer
- Dee Shipman, songwriter
- Ellen Biddle Shipman (1869–1950), American landscape architect
- Ernest Shipman (1871-1931), Canadian producer
- Ernest Shipman (pilot), World War II Air Force pilot Ace
- Evan Biddle Shipman, horse-racing columnist for the New York Morning Telegraph; see Evan Shipman Handicap
- Gary Shipman (born 1966), American comic book artist, husband of Rhoda Shipman
- Gwynne Shipman, 1909-2005), American actress
- Harold Shipman (1946–2004), British physician and serial killer
- Herbert Shipman (1869–1930), American Episcopalian bishop
- Helen Shipman (1899–1984), American actress
- Jamar Shipman (born 1985), American professional wrestler better known as Jay Lethal
- John Greenwood Shipman (1848–1918), English barrister and politician
- Madisyn Shipman (born 2002), American actress
- Mark Shipman (born 1973), British diver
- Matt Shipman, American voice actor
- Megan Shipman (born 1992), American voice actress
- Nathaniel Shipman (1828–1906), United States federal judge
- Nell Shipman (1892–1970), Canadian actress
- Nina Shipman, (born 1930), American actress
- Rhoda Shipman (born 1968), American comic book writer, wife of Gary Shipman
- Vera Brady Shipman (1889–1932), American composer, journalist, and writer
- William Shipman (Medal of Honor) (1831–1894), American sailor
- William Davis Shipman (1818-1898), United States federal judge
- William Herbert Shipman (1854–1943), businessman on the island of Hawaiʻi

== Places ==
- Shipman, Illinois, United States
- Shipman Township, Macoupin County, Illinois, United States
- Shipman, Virginia, United States
- Shipman, Saskatchewan, Canada
- Shipman Knotts, a fell in the Lake District of England
- W.H. Shipman House, a historic house in Hilo, Hawaii

== Other uses ==
- Shipman (television film), a television drama about the crimes of Harold Shipman
