= Seedhill =

Seedhill is the name of two sports venues in the town of Nelson, Lancashire. These stadia are:

- Seedhill Football Ground, former home of English football team Nelson F.C.
- Seedhill Cricket Ground, home of Lancashire League side Nelson Cricket Club, England
