= Horace Snary =

English cricketer

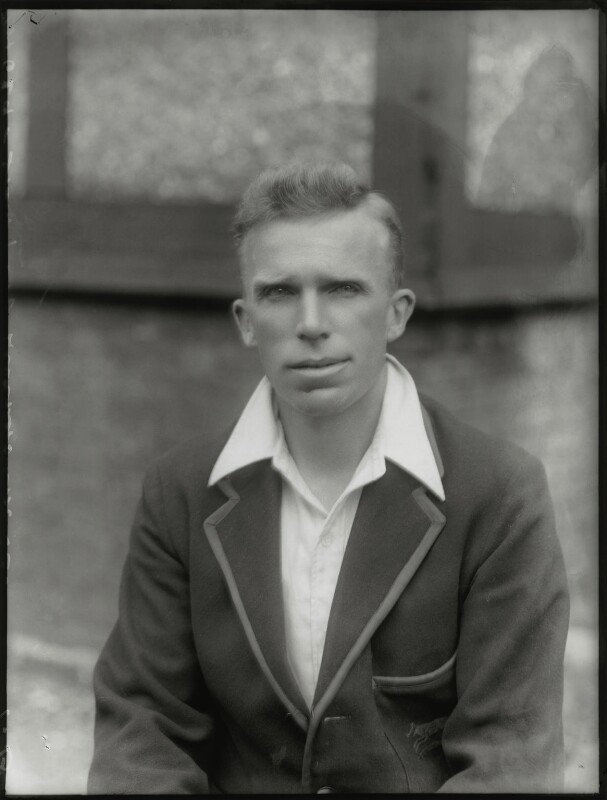
- Snary in 1931

Personal information
- Full name: Horace Charles Snary
- Born: 22 September 1897; Whissendine, Rutland, England
- Died: 26 December 1966 (aged 69); Leicester, Leicestershire
- Batting: Right-handed
- Bowling: Right-arm slow medium
- Role: Bowler

Domestic team information
- Years: Team
- 1921–33: Leicestershire
- First-class debut: 11 June 1921 Leicestershire v Yorkshire
- Last First-class: 1 September 1933 Leicestershire v Surrey

Career statistics
Competition	First-class
Matches	183
Runs scored	2156
Batting average	15.97
100s/50s	1/–
Top score	124*
Balls bowled	35414
Wickets	419
Bowling average	24.27
5 wickets in innings	12
10 wickets in match	1
Best bowling	7/31
Catches/stumpings	115/–
- Source: CricketArchive, 22 July 2013

Horace Charles Snary (22 September 1897 – 26 December 1966) was an English cricketer who played first-class cricket for Leicestershire between 1921 and 1933. He was born at Whissendine, Rutland, and died at Leicester.

== Army service ==
Snary joined the 2/6th Battalion of the South Staffordshire Regiment at the age of 18 and saw action in Ireland during the 1916 Easter Rising. Having been promoted to lance-corporal he accompanied the battalion to France in February 1917. He saw action in the Third Battle of Ypres from September to November 1917, where he suffered lung damage leading to double pneumonia, ending his military career with the rank of sergeant. His twin brother William was killed in action in 1917.

== Cricket career ==
Snary was a right-handed lower-order batsman and an extremely economical right-arm slow- to medium-pace bowler: through his career, he conceded only 1.72 runs per over. He made his first-class debut for Leicestershire in a couple of matches in 1921 but made little impression, failing to take a wicket.

In 1924, Leicestershire, to that point one of the weaker first-class counties, decided that a more professional approach was needed for success; the club appointed its first-ever professional coach, the former Surrey and England player Ernie Hayes, and entered a second eleven in the Minor Counties Championship for the first time. Snary, Haydon Smith and Norman Armstrong were among players who later became prominent who were brought on through this system and in the team's first season in the Minor Counties Snary took 38 wickets at a cost of less than 12 runs per wicket, including a return of five wickets for six runs against Buckinghamshire. He made one first-team appearance in 1924 and three in 1925 – finally taking a first-class wicket – and then came into the team regularly in the second half of the 1926 season. Wisden Cricketers' Almanack noted that he was "able to keep an excellent length and make the ball go away" and that he "required careful watching".

Snary played regularly in Leicestershire's first team from 1927 onwards as an accurate, containing bowler. He took 34 wickets in 20 matches in 1927, but doubled that to 68 from 30 games in 1928. George Geary had been out of form in 1928 and his return to bowling strength in 1929 meant that Snary played less, but he was again a regular member of the side in the three years from 1930 to 1932, and in 1931 he took 101 wickets in the season, at an average of 18.11. Snary's role was as economical back-up to Leicestershire's frontline bowlers and in no innings in 27 County Championship matches, despite taking 80 wickets in those games, did he take more than four wickets in an innings. Against Cambridge University, however, he took seven wickets for 31 in the university's first innings and, with three for 34 in the second innings he finished with match figures of 10 wickets for 65 runs in 61.3 overs, the best innings and match figures of his career.

Snary's batting was not rated at Leicestershire until late in his career, and he spent most of his first-class matches batting at No 9 or No 10: a career average of 15 and an extremely high proportion of not-out innings – 114 out of 249 – indicate that he was probably under-rated as a batsman, but he only passed 50 once. That was in 1932 in the game against the Indian touring team when, having top-scored with 25 in Leicestershire's first innings batting at No 8, he was sent in to open the innings when the county followed on and carried his bat throughout an innings of 291, scoring 124 not out himself.

The 1933 season was a poor one for both Snary and Leicestershire. The county finished bottom of the County Championship for the first time (it had been jointly at the foot of the table before, but never on its own) and finance became very tight. Snary's bowling was less effective in terms of containment than before – he conceded runs at more than two per over – and he took only 23 wickets, playing in around half the team's games. He left the staff at the end of the season and did not play any further first-class cricket.

== Later life ==
After Snary retired from first-class cricket he returned to his native village of Whissendine, where he established a successful farming business producing poultry, fruit and vegetables. He also contracted to lay cricket pitches and tennis courts. He played for Whissendine Cricket Club until the 1950s. In 1950, when the owner of the club's ground decided to sell the land, throwing the future of the club into doubt, Snary bought the land himself, guaranteeing the club's survival.

Towards the end of his life Snary suffered from ill-health, including glaucoma, which left him blind, and a recurrence of his wartime breathing difficulties. He died in Leicester Royal Infirmary in 1966.
