= Nelson F.C. =

Association football club in Nelson, England

Coordinates: 53°50′11.66″N 2°13′44.77″W

Nelson
- Full name: Nelson Football Club
- Nicknames: The Admirals, Blues; previously Seedhillites
- Founded: 23 October 1882; 143 years ago
- Ground: Victoria Park, Nelson
- Capacity: 1,500 (150 seated)
- Chairman: Chris Price
- Manager: Arron Ripley
- League: North West Counties League Premier Division
- 2025–26: North West Counties League Division One North, 1st of 18 (promoted)
Home colours	Away colours

Nelson Football Club is a football club based in Nelson, Lancashire, England. Originally established in 1882, the club played in the Lancashire League, North-East Lancashire Combination, Lancashire Combination and Central League before becoming founding members of the Football League Third Division North in 1921. They were Third Division North champions in 1923 and were promoted to the Second Division. However, they were relegated back to the Third Division North after a single season.

In 1931, the club lost their Football League status and returned to the Lancashire Combination, where, following the summer reformation of 1934, they played on until ceasing all activity in 1936. A new amateur club, Nelson Town, was assembled, playing at Seedhill until the outbreak of World War II in September 1939. Following the resumption of football at the end of the war, Nelson FC reformed again in 1946. The reconstituted club joined the Lancashire Combination; they played until it merged with the Cheshire County League to form the North West Counties League in 1982. Nelson dropped out of the league for the seasons between 1988 and 1992, playing in the West Lancashire League. Although the club left again in 2010, they returned the following year and are currently members of the North West Counties League Premier Division, playing home matches at Victoria Park.

== History ==
=== Early years (1882–1921) ===
On 23 October 1882, a meeting was held between members of Nelson Cricket Club at the Victoria Hall on Scotland Road; John Greenwood presided over the meeting and enrolled around 25 members to the newly formed Nelson Football Club before a trial match held on 11 November 1882 saw the Probables beat a team of Improbables 3–0. The new Nelson FC's first reported game was a 3–1 home defeat to Burnley Olympic on 2 December 1882.

Nelson were founder members of the Lancashire League in the 1889–90 season, finishing in 4th place. They were champions of the league in 1895–96, winning 22 out of 30 games, scoring 105 goals, and placing runners-up two seasons later in 1897–98. However, after enduring a month-long suspension from The Football Association (FA), the club ceased all operations during the 1898–99 season following a 3–2 home defeat against Ashton North End on 12 January, the ground being seized at the end of the month because of outstanding debts. The Lancashire FA expelled the club, and their records for that season were subsequently expunged. Following a season in the North-East Lancashire Combination, when Nelson finished as League Champions and defeated Oswaldtwistle Rovers 4–1 in the Shield Final, the reformed club joined the Lancashire League in time for the 1900–01 season, finishing sixth. In 1901–02, they joined the Lancashire Combination. In 1903–04, the league expanded into two divisions, with Nelson playing in Division One. However, after finishing 18th in 1906–07, they were lowered to Division Two where they stayed for only one season before being promoted back to Division One. The club decided to stop playing before the 1916–17 season, with nearly all of its players having been called up for World War I and the club suffering significant financial losses. The club re-started in 1918, joining the Central League in 1919–20 and staying there for two seasons.

=== Football League years (1921–1936) ===
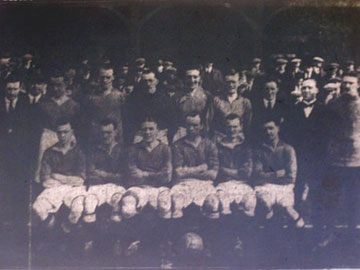
The Nelson team who won the Football League Third Division North in the 1922–23 season

Player-manager David Wilson led Nelson to the Third Division North title in 1922–23

In 1921, the club joined the Football League as a founder member of the Third Division North. Their first league game, a 2–1 defeat to the now-defunct Wigan Borough, attracted a record attendance of 9,000 on 27 August 1921. The team finished 16th in their first season in the Football League, although they struggled with comparatively low attendances.

The following season of 1922–23 was when they finished as champions of the Third Division North, earning a promotion on 24 April 1923 with a 2–0 home win over Wrexham and were promoted to the Second Division, the first and only time the club played in a national league. In preparation for the new season in the Second Division, the club went on a pre-season tour to Spain in the summer of 1923, winning two of their games: beating Real Oviedo 2–1 and Real Madrid 4–2. This made them the first English team to beat Real Madrid in Spain. During their short Second Division stay, they finished 21st out of 22 in 1923–24, and were relegated back to the Third Division North. However, they were the first team to score at high-flying Blackpool and also beat eventual champions Leeds United at home. In March, Nelson beat Manchester United. The following season, they finished as runners-up to Darlington on their return to the Third Division North; since then, the football team has never managed to compete at a national level.

During the 1925-26 season, Nelson had a player capped at international level for the first and only time. Half back John Newnes, better known as Jack, was selected by Wales to face Northern Ireland at Windsor Park in Belfast, losing 1-0.

Jimmy Hampson played for Nelson between 1926 and 1927. On 10 April 1926, a record attendance of 14,143 at Seedhill saw a 2–2 draw with Bradford Park Avenue. They reached the second round of the FA Cup in 1926–27, beating Stockport County 4–1 at home in the first round before losing 2–1 away to Ashington in the second round. During that season, they finished 5th; however, the club finished in last place in 1927–28 conceding 135 goals, and they found themselves £6,500 in debt. Eventually, they were re-elected to the league. In 1930–31, they reached the second round of the FA Cup for a second time. In the first round, they beat Workington 4–0, then lost 2–1 to York City in a replay after a 1–1 draw. However, they dropped to last place on 26 December 1930, where they stayed for the rest of the season. After placing last again, they failed to win re-election and were voted out of the Football League after a second vote following a tie. They were replaced by Chester City. The club's last game in the Football League was a 4–0 defeat to Hull City on 2 May 1931. The club then dropped back into the Lancashire Combination.

Within three years, continuing financial pressures saw the Football League directors ordering that the club must permanently close, following a meeting on 17 May 1934. A new company was quickly formed that summer with the Nelson Leader of 3 August 1934 further reporting a change of kit to white shirts and black shorts; yet just two years later, Nelson ceased football activities on 4 August 1936 on the eve of the new season after once again "incurring a big financial loss". The club subsequently endured a ten-year hiatus before returning in 1946.

=== Nelson Town (1936–1939) ===
A new hastily formed amateur club, Nelson Town, entered the local Nelson and Colne League in time for the 1936–37 season and duly lost their first fixture at Seedhill against James Nelson SC 3–2 with receipts totaling £3 15s 6d (admission being 2d). The first team would go on to complete two seasons in the Lancashire Amateur League — which they had joined in time for the new season beginning in September 1937. Nelson Town also continued to field a side in the Nelson and Colne League. Following their final game of the 1938–39 campaign, Town announced a first venture into senior football for the coming season as new members of the West Lancashire League. However, only two games of the 1939–40 season were played before the outbreak of World War II. Town lost 3–2 at home to Netherfield Reserves on 2 September, following a 0–0 draw at Astley Bridge in their opening game on 26 August. Nelson Town declined to join the wartime Lancashire Cominbation. Seedhill hosted for the Nelson Home Guard team members of the newly formed Burnley Wartime League.

=== Post-Second World War (1946–1982) ===
Following the Second World War and a public meeting held at the Imperial Ballroom Carr Road on 6 April 1946, Nelson FC was re-formed, and immediately joined the Lancashire Combination in time for the new season — finishing 11th in 1946–47. The Nelson Leader of 31 May 1946 reported that the name of the club would be Nelson Football and Athletic Club Ltd. as the company had — whilst inactive since 1936 — been maintained and supported by its existing board of directors. The following season, they were runners-up; for the next few seasons, the club participated in both the Lancashire Combination and its cup competitions. A fourth-place finish in 1947–48 was followed by the club being crowned champions in 1949–50 — scoring 125 league goals — additionally winning the Lancashire Combination Cup. They won second place in 1950–51, losing the title on goal-average, while scoring 120 goals. In that same season, Nelson won the Combination Cup once more and reached the second round of the FA Cup. Nelson started the competition in the first qualifying round where they beat Lancaster City 5–2, Leyland Motors 4–1 in the second qualifying round, followed by victories over Bacup Borough (2–0 in the third qualifying round) and Hyde United (3–0 in a replay in the fourth qualifying round). In the first round, they beat Witton Albion 1–0 before losing 3–2 to Port Vale in the second round. In 1951–52, they were champions for a second time, scoring 139 goals with Joe Fagan later managing Liverpool. A 5th-place finish in 1952–53, Fagan's second and final season in charge, was followed by a 3rd place in 1953–54. However, despite finishing as champions twice, the club applied for re-election to the Football League unsuccessfully. In 1954–55, they won the Lancashire FA Challenge Trophy and the Lancashire Combination Cup for a third time in 1959–60. In 1960–61, they were runners-up in the Combination, the closest the club came to winning the title again. However, in 1965–66, they finished 21st out of 22 and were downgraded to Division Two. The Lancashire Combination lost many of its clubs to the newly formed Northern Premier League in 1968. However, Nelson remained in the Combination. In their final season, 1981–82, they finished 3rd.

=== Modern era (1983) ===
Nelson became founder members of the new North West Counties Football League, joining the Third Division. They finished 10th out of 18 in their first season, 1982–83. The 1986–87 season placed them in fourth place. The following season, the Third Division was scrapped, and Nelson were moved up to the Second Division, finishing in 16th. However, the frailty of the Victoria Park Stadium as well as problems getting it up to the standard required by the league, the club was forced to drop down to the West Lancashire League, where they played in the Second Division and remained for four seasons from 1988–89 to 1991–92. They ended up placing as high as 15th, and were re-admitted to the North West Counties Second Division for the 1992–93 season after Victoria Park was upgraded; they finished 17th out of 18 in their first season. In 1996–97, they won the Division Two Trophy. In 1999–2000, they finished 3rd. In 2000–01, they finished in the third and final promotion place on the final day of the season above Atherton Laburnum Rovers. However, Atherton were granted a replay of their final game as their opponents had fielded an ineligible player. Atherton won the replayed game, claiming the third sport from Nelson. In 2005–06, they finished 3rd and were promoted to the First Division, the club's first promotion in 83 years.

They finished 20th out of 22 in 2006–07 and last place in 2007–08, although they were not relegated. In 2008–09, the First Division was renamed the Premier Division; Nelson finished in 17th position out of 22 despite winning just three home games, The Blues finished 16 points clear against Atherton Collieries. On 15 July 2010, the North West Counties League announced that Nelson had resigned from the league with immediate effect, which threatened to end their 129-year existence. Chairman, Alan Pickering, cited a lack of sponsors, volunteers and spiralling costs to blame for the clubs demise. Nelson had been struggling financially for the preceding couple of seasons and the club had been actively up for sale. Nelson continued to operate junior teams, however, and made an application to rejoin the North West Counties League for the 2011–12 season, which was later approved by the FA. Nelson had to start at a division lower than they were previously operating, in Division One, but could only manage a 15th place finish.

Mark Fell was appointed first team manager in November 2012 after Michael Morrison and Robert Grimes were sacked and Nelson’s fortunes started to turn. Fell brought in a host of new signings and established a permanent base and training ground for the club at Accrington and Rossendale College, using the same facilities at the time as EFL League Two side Accrington Stanley. He led the side to 10th place in 2012–13 and in his first full season in charge, Nelson were crowned champions, earning promotion back to the Premier Division in the process. It was Nelson's first league title in 62 years and they finished the campaign with a remarkable 135 goals in just 38 games, averaging over 3 goals per game. Peter Wright finished as the Division One top goalscorer with 38 goals. Fell’s side also went on a 14 game winning streak to end the campaign. Nelson initially struggled to adapt back to life in the Premier Division in 2014–15, but went on an eleven game unbeaten run to sit in the play-off places at Christmas. However, the loss of several players saw the side slip down to finish in mid-table.

== Colours ==
The club's traditional colours are blue shirts and white shorts, which were re-adopted by 1913, the club previously having changed in 1902 from its original light blue to green with a yellow sash, and by 1907 claret and light blue.

== Playing grounds ==
=== Early years (1882–1889) ===
From 1882 to 1884, Nelson F.C. played at the Seedhill Cricket Ground.

Through 1884 to 1885 and 1886 to 1887, they played in the Flower Show Field off Scotland Road, on the opposite side of the road to The Derby Inn.

Between 1885 and 1886, the sporting area was an unknown site outside of town. In March, despite a Lancashire FA suspension, an agreement was made to return to Nelson Cricket Club.

Between 1887 and 1889, they played once again at the Seedhill Cricket Ground — now renamed as the Seedhill Football Ground — until 16 March when the new enclosure was opened.

=== Seedhill Football Ground (1889–1971) ===
Nelson are often cited as playing at the Park Ground or Parkside Ground, a move reflected in oft-used contemporary reference to the club as The Parksiders. Given the location adjacent to both the park and the existing Seedhill Cricket Ground, these are possibly alternate terms for what became Seedhill Football Ground or equally describe the use of local grounds. When reviewing the 1887–1888 season on 21 April 1888, the Burnley Express mentions that the club had accepted an offer from the cricketers to "change ends and play on the left instead of the right hand side of the field as previously" at the start of the season. About a year later, and perhaps more significantly, The Burnley Express of 20 April 1889 refers to the "Seedhill Men making their first senior appearance on the 'enclosure at Seed Hill' on 16 March" when Burnley were the visitors (Burnley won 6–0). The 1890 OS map of Nelson shows a defined football area to the southern edge of the cricket ground with a small building possibly a pavilion to the left of the football pitch. Twice in the 1890s, fresh moves away were considered as Nelson looked at a site near Kew Gardens in 1892 and a field behind the Golden Ball Inn three years later. However, the potential rental costs proved problematic for the club who were already financially struggling with Seedhill. At Seedhill, the club had a small wooden stand and a small covered enclosure behind one goal, with grass banking around the rest of the ground. In 1922, a large 2,000 capacity wooden stand was built. The club's highest attendance at the stadium was 14,979 for a Third Division North match with Bradford City on 27 April 1929. The Burnley Express of 1 May 1929 commenting on the record gate at the match which Nelson lost 1–0 stated there was "Glorious weather prevailed and City had one of their biggest followings, there being little doubt that the visitors to the ground were in the majority. The 'Gate' reached £810 which is more than has been taken in the previous six matches".

Nelson played their final home game at Seedhill on 28 March 1971 when a crowd of over a thousand gathered to witness the first Sunday fixture at the stadium. They were duly rewarded with an eight-goal thriller as Clitheroe were beaten 5–3. Seedhill, having hosted the Nelson Admirals speedway team between 1967 and 1969, latterly became a well known stock car venue before its eventual demolition in the early 1980s when the M65 motorway cut through the area. As of February 2025, the site of Seedhill is currently under construction as the home of the proposed new Pendle Police Station.

=== Victoria Park (1971) ===
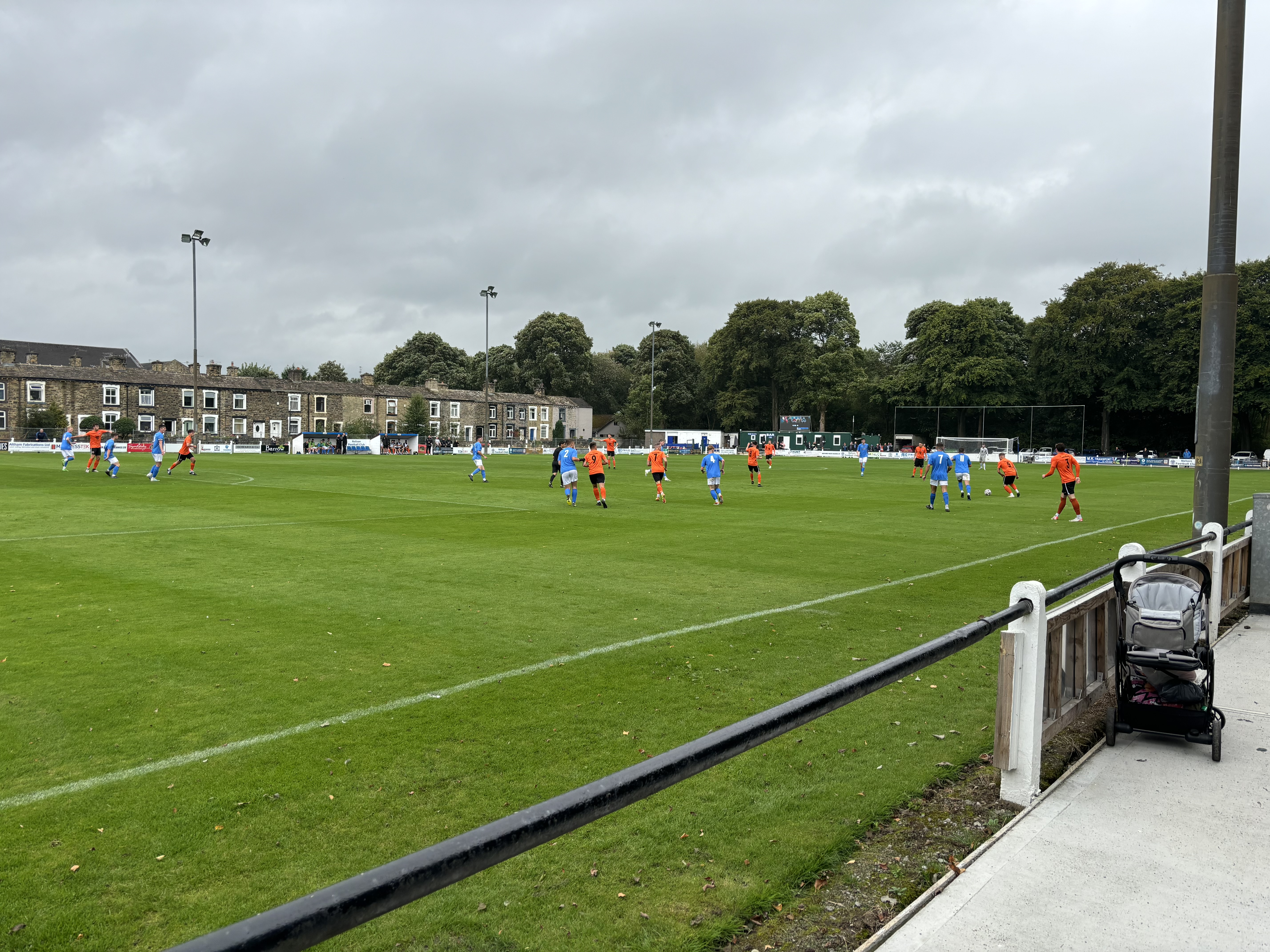
Victoria Park, Nelson v Euxton Villa in 2024

Nelson moved to Victoria Park (known locally as Little Wembley) in time for their opening home fixture of the following 1971–72 Lancashire Combination season; it was a time when the Nelson Leader reported a "good crowd" attended to see them lose 1–0 to Accrington Stanley on 28 August 1971. Victoria Park now has a capacity of 2,000 with 1,700 standing. It is bordered by trees on two sides in surrounding parkland. Along one side, there is a low-roofed wooden stand with seating in the centre section. The side opposite has the dugouts with a grass area. Behind one goal are the clubhouse and changing rooms at the top end of the ground.

In January 2009, Nelson launched an appeal, the £10K Floodlight Appeal, to help improve the floodlighting facilities at Victoria Park. Due to the costs surrounding the floodlight repairs, the club announced plans to relocate to their original pitch on Seedhill and preliminary discussions were held with the local authorities. However, the plans never came to fruition. In September 2013, the dugouts at Victoria Park were replaced and improved to meet a league ground grading requirement for the North West Counties League, which included facilities for a fourth official if required. This also enabled them to meet the ground grading requirements of the Northern Premier League if promotion was achieved.

In the summer of 2024, the ground received some major improvements with the construction of a new stand behind the near goal across from the clubhouse, alongside new concrete hardstanding around the perimeter of the pitch. A new heated sponsors lounge was erected along with a food and drink kiosk. The original clubhouse was also demolished and replaced with a new building and toilet block at the top end of the pitch which was part of a £250,000+ investment in the club from the new owners, Chris Price & Stewart Fort. The ground now also has a large screen placed on top of the clubhouse which enables match replays to be displayed along with a scoreboard, which was a rarity in the North West Counties League at the time. As part of the refurbishment the pitch was also upgraded with a robust drainage system installed to help keep the playing surface in better condition all year round.

== First-team squad ==
As of 1 July 2026

Note: Flags indicate national team as defined under FIFA eligibility rules; some limited exceptions apply. Players may hold more than one non-FIFA nationality.

No.	Pos.	Nation	Player
—	GK	ENG	Chris Thompson
—	DF	ENG	Alex Green
—	DF	RSA	Darren Holden
—	DF	ENG	Cameron Lancaster
—	DF	ENG	Billy Priestley
—	DF	ENG	Andrew Teague
—	DF	ENG	Jack Wyers-Roebuck
—	MF	ENG	Richie Baker
—	MF	ENG	Lewis Brown
—	MF	ENG	Jamie Edwards

No.	Pos.	Nation	Player
—	MF	ENG	Andy Hill
—	MF	ENG	Jared Gilbey
—	MF	ENG	George Hutchinson
—	MF	ENG	Sean Ince
—	MF	ENG	Will Ludlow-Foster
—	MF	ENG	Olly Stephenson
—	FW	ENG	Max Cane
—	FW	ENG	Sefton Gonzales
—	FW	ENG	Luke Hepple
—	FW	ENG	James Kemp

== Honours ==
League

- Football League Third Division North (level 3)
  - Champions: 1922–23
- Lancashire League (level 3)
  - Champions: 1895–96
- Lancashire Combination (level 4)
  - Champions: 1949–50, 1951–52
- North-East Lancashire Combination (level 4)
  - Champions: 1899–1900
- Lancashire Combination Division Two (level 5)
  - Promoted: 1907–08
- North West Counties Football League Division Two / First Division / First Division North (level 10)
  - Champions: 2013–14, 2025–26
  - Promoted: 2005–06

Cup

- Lancashire FA Challenge Trophy
  - Winners: 1907–08, 1954–55
- Lancashire Combination League Cup
  - Winners: 1949–50, 1950–51, 1959–60
- Lancashire Combination Bridge Shield
  - Winners: 1975–76, 1981–82
- Lancashire Combination George Watson Trophy
  - Winners: 1978–79
- North-East Lancashire Shield
  - Winners: 1899–1900
- North West Counties Football League Second Division Trophy
  - Winners: 1996–97

== Records ==
- Best FA Cup performance: Second round, 1926–27, 1930–31, 1950–51
- Best FA Trophy performance: Second qualifying round, 1975–76
- Best FA Vase performance: Fourth round, 2025–26
- Record attendance: 14,979 vs Bradford City, Third Division North, 27 April 1929 (at Seedhill)

== See also ==
- List of Nelson F.C. seasons
- Nelson F.C. players
- Nelson F.C. managers
