= William Shipman =

William Shipman may refer to:

- William Davis Shipman (1818–1898), Federal Judge for the United States District Court for the District of Connecticut
- William Shipman (Medal of Honor) (1831–1894), U.S. Navy sailor and Medal of Honor recipient
- William Herbert Shipman (1854–1943), businessman on the island of Hawaii
- Bill Shipman (1886–1943), English cricketer
