= Vale of Catmose =

Valley in Rutland, England

Coordinates: 52.65°N 0.68°W

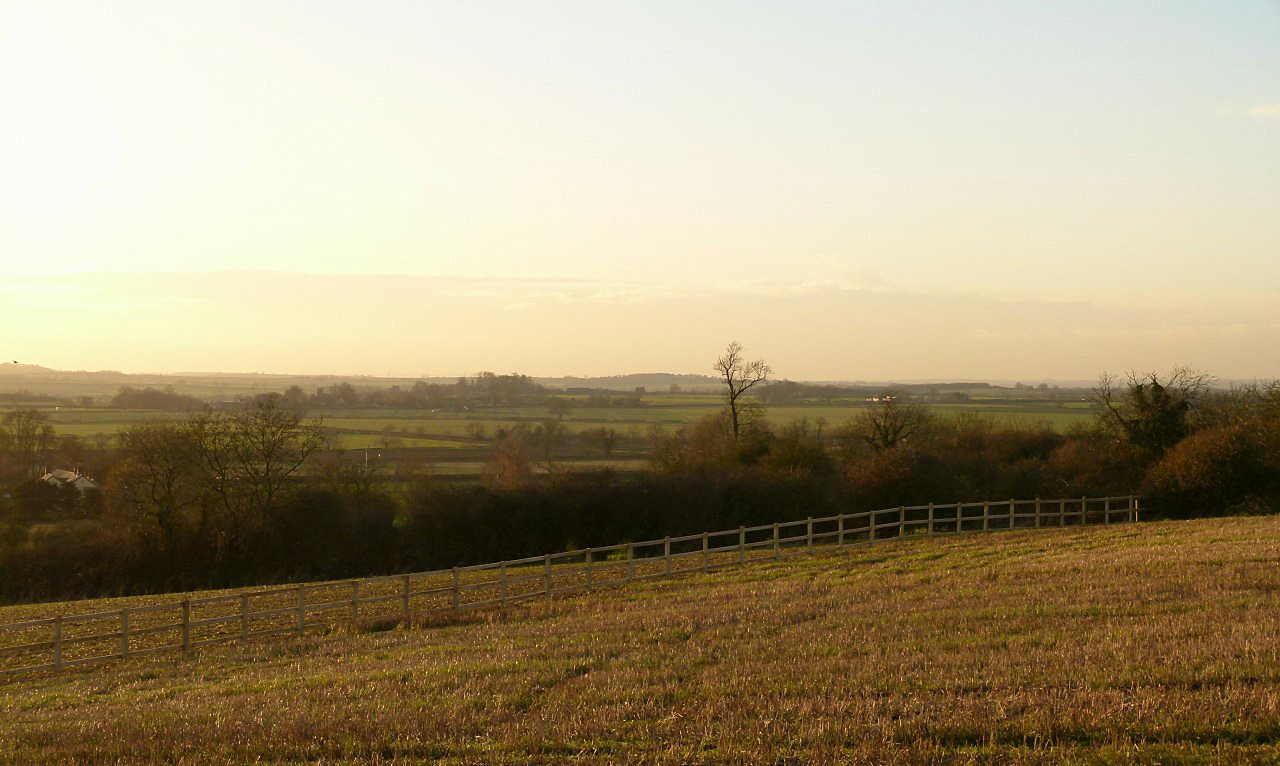
View over the vale from Market Overton

The Vale of Catmose is an area of relatively low-lying land, much of which is flooded by Rutland Water, in western Rutland, England. Oakham, the county town, lies within its bounds. It is drained by the River Gwash and the Langham Brook.

The name (recorded in 1576 as Val of Catmouse) means "bog or marsh frequented by (wild)cats", from Old English catt and mos. Institutions named after the vale include Catmose College, Catmose House, and Catmose Vale Hospital, all situated in Oakham.
