= Haydon Smith =

English cricketer (1901–1948)

Personal information
- Full name: Haydon Arthur Smith
- Born: 29 March 1901; Groby, Leicestershire, England
- Died: 7 August 1948 (aged 47); Groby, Leicestershire
- Batting: Right-handed
- Bowling: Right-arm fast
- Role: Bowler
- Relatives: Terry Spencer, nephew

Domestic team information
- Years: Team
- 1925–39: Leicestershire
- First-class debut: 20 May 1925 Leicestershire v Cambridge University
- Last First-class: 29 August 1939 Leicestershire v Glamorgan

Career statistics
Competition	First-class
Matches	341
Runs scored	4603
Batting average	11.01
100s/50s	1/6
Top score	100*
Balls bowled	65900
Wickets	1076
Bowling average	25.99
5 wickets in innings	66
10 wickets in match	11
Best bowling	8/40
Catches/stumpings	257/–
- Source: CricketArchive, 28 July 2013

Haydon Arthur Smith (29 March 1901 – 7 August 1948) was an English cricketer who played first-class cricket for Leicestershire from 1925 to 1939. He was born and died at Groby, Leicestershire. He was the uncle of later Leicestershire cricketer Terry Spencer.

Smith was a lower-order right-handed batsman and a right-arm fast bowler. Early in his career he was considered promising as a batsman and scarcely bowled, but his batting did not develop and although he often made runs he was largely "a useful hitter". Unusually for the fast bowlers of his period, he was a good fielder, taking 257 catches in his 341 first-class games.

== Cricket career ==
In 1924, Leicestershire, to that point one of the weaker first-class cricket counties, decided that a more professional approach was needed for success; the club appointed its first-ever professional coach, the former Surrey and England player Ernie Hayes, and entered a second eleven in the Minor Counties Championship for the first time. Smith, Horace Snary and Norman Armstrong were among players who later became prominent who were brought on through this system, and Smith made his first-class debut in the 1925 season. He played in 19 matches in that season but took only 12 wickets. At this stage he was apparently regarded primarily as a batting all-rounder: he hit three scores of more than 50 in the season, though his batting average for 448 runs was only 13.57. Over the next two seasons his figures got worse in terms of number of matches played, batting average and number of wickets taken.

Smith's first breakthrough season as a bowler was 1928. George Geary was injured for much of the season and unable to bowl much even when he played as a batsman, and Smith stepped up to open the bowling regularly: he took 80 wickets at an average of 26.36. "Tall and strong, he bowled fairly fast, with a good high action that made the ball gather pace from the pitch," Wisden wrote. Geary's return to fitness in 1929 meant fewer opportunities for Smith, however, and over the two following seasons, 1930 and 1931, he appeared in only half the first team's matches and took only around 30 or so wickets each year.

Smith's second breakthrough season was 1932 when he appeared in all matches and compensated for the decline in other bowlers such as Snary and Alan Shipman by taking 83 wickets at an average of 25.73. In fact, Smith continued to prosper as his colleagues declined: in 1933, Leicestershire experienced what Wisden termed "their worst season since they were promoted to first-class rank in 1895". The county finished at the bottom of the County Championship table for the first time, and both batting weaknesses and ageing bowlers were exposed; Smith, by contrast, had his best season yet and his 118 wickets put him at the top of the county's bowling averages. He did not maintain that leading position in 1934 as other bowlers recovered their form, but in fact his figures were better: 121 wickets at an average of 22.56. His second innings analysis of six wickets for 39 runs was responsible for Leicestershire's first victory over Yorkshire for 23 years. The Times report said that it was "the most sensational victory of the season": Yorkshire had declared their first innings 102 ahead with only five wickets down but, set 149 to win, were all out for 90.

The 1935 season was, wrote Wisden, "the most successful in the history of the club" and Smith's bowling in combination with Geary was singled out as a prime reason: "It is no exaggeration to say that last season no other county save Yorkshire could boast of two such consistently successful bowlers," it said. In early June, the pair bowled unchanged through four consecutive County Championship match innings, culminating in the game against Northamptonshire when Smith took eight for 44 and three for 47, and Geary took two for 32 and seven for 30 to win the game by an innings inside two days. In all matches, Smith took 150 wickets, his best total, at an average of 19.66, which was also his best bowling average in any season; he took five wickets in an innings 15 times and 10 wickets in a match five times.

Over the next four seasons, Leicestershire's fortunes declined to the point where they were bottom of the County Championship again in 1939; Smith never achieved again the number of wickets or the economy he had done in 1935, but he remained a significant wicket-taker right through to 1939. In both 1936 and 1937 he took 100 wickets in the season again, heading the county's average in the second of those year. It was in 1937 too that Smith finally came good as a batsman: in the game against Worcestershire he scored an unbeaten 100, his runs coming out of 154 scored while he was at the wicket. It was the only century of his career and 1937 was the only season in which batting average was higher than 15.

Smith's bowling slipped below 100 wickets in the 1938 season, but the 92 that he took included a return of eight wickets for 40 runs in the match against Gloucestershire and these were the best figures of his career. Smith was still Leicestershire's leading wicket-taker in 1939, but in a poor season the number had declined to 77.

Smith continued to play in non-first-class matches for Leicestershire throughout the Second World War but he was 45 when first-class cricket resumed in 1946 and he did not play again. At the time of his sudden death at the age of 47 in 1948 he was the groundsman and cricket coach at Ashby Grammar School.
