= Langham Brook =

River in Leicestershire and Rutland, England

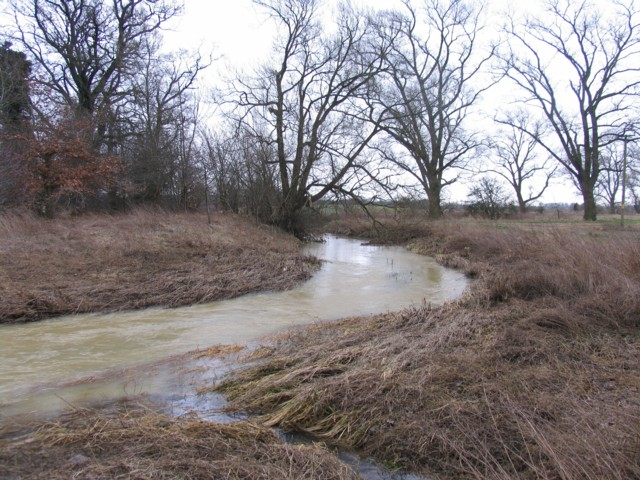
- The Langham Brook in spate towards Stapleford Park

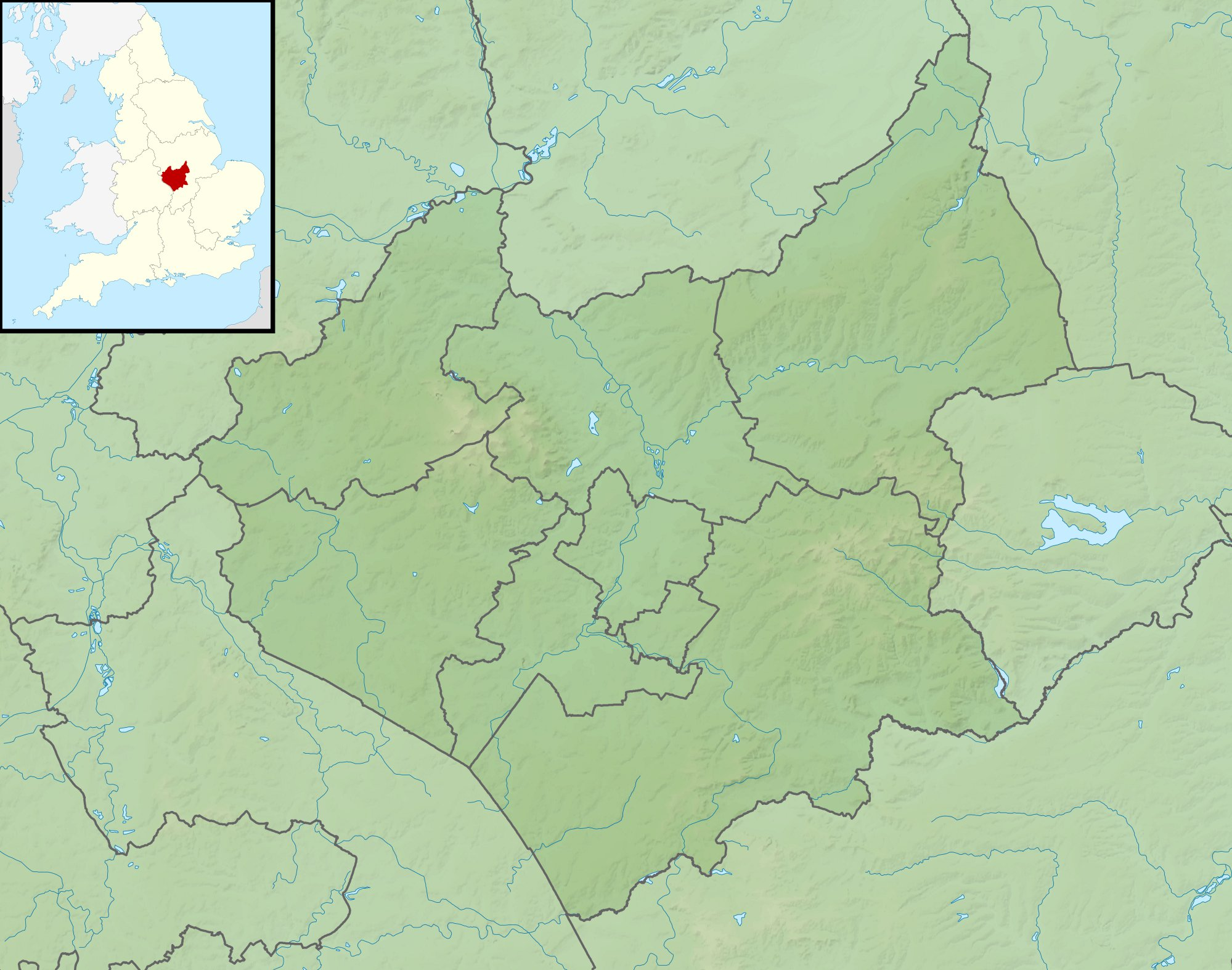
- Location of the river mouth in Leicestershire

Location
- Country: England
- Counties: Leicestershire, Rutland

Physical characteristics
- Source
  - location: Cold Overton, Leicestershire
  - coordinates: 52.676649°N 0.784547°W
  - elevation: 156 m (512 ft)
- Mouth: River Eye
  - location: Stapleford, Leicestershire
  - coordinates: 52.759743°N 0.793507°W
  - elevation: 84 m (276 ft)

Basin features
- River system: River Soar
- Tributaries
  - left: Whissendine Brook

The Langham Brook is a watercourse in the East Midlands of England. It is a tributary of the River Eye and part of the River Soar catchment.

== Course ==
The Langham Brook rises to the east of Cold Overton in Leicestershire and flows north-eastwards and across the county boundary into Rutland. It then passes through the centre of the village of Langham where its course was re-routed in the 1920s to make more space available for burials in the parish churchyard.

Upon leaving the village, it continues in an easterly direction before encircling the village of Ashwell where it then begins to flow towards the north-west. The construction of the Oakham Canal and the Syston and Peterborough Railway resulted in many modifications to the Langham Brook's course in the 19th century that can still be seen through this reach.

It then flows underneath the Birmingham to Peterborough railway line halfway between Wymondham and Whissendine where for a short time it forms the county boundary between Rutland and Leicestershire. Soon thereafter, it picks up a small amount of flow from the Whissendine Brook and Somerby Brook before flowing through the grounds of Stapleford Park where it meets the River Eye.

== Status ==
For the purposes of monitoring under the Water Framework Directive, the Langham Brook is separated into two sections.

The upper section, running from the source at Cold Overton to the confluence with the Whissendine Brook, had an overall classification of 'Moderate' when assessed in 2016. Factors preventing this section achieving a good status were high levels of phosphate originating from continuous sewage discharge and poor soil management in the surrounding agricultural land.

The lower section is much shorter and runs from the confluence of the Whissendine Brook to where it meets the River Eye. This section also had an overall classification of 'Moderate' in 2016, but had a greater number of issues preventing it from achieving a good status. These include continuous sewage discharge from both the water industry and private septic tanks and poor nutrient management in the surrounding agricultural land.
