= Terry Spencer =

English cricketer (1931–2020)

Personal information
- Full name: Charles Terence Spencer
- Born: August 18, 1931
- Died: February 2, 2020 (aged 88)
- Batting: Right-handed
- Bowling: Right-arm medium

Career statistics
Competition	First-class	List A
Matches	506	89
Runs scored	5,871	139
Batting average	10.77	7.31
100s/50s	0/7	0/0
Top score	90	18*
Balls bowled	79,357	4,306
Wickets	1,367	127
Bowling average	26.68	20.75
5 wickets in innings	47	1
10 wickets in match	6	0
Best bowling	9/63	5/13
Catches/stumpings	381/–	27/–
- Source: CricketArchive, 17 April 2020

Charles Terence Spencer (18 August 1931 – 2 February 2020) was an English first-class cricketer who played for Leicestershire. Only Ewart Astill and George Geary have taken more wickets for Leicestershire. His career best figures of 9-63 were made in 1954 against Yorkshire. He is the nephew of Leicestershire fast bowler Haydon Smith.

== Early career ==
Terry Spencer began playing for club side, Leicester Veronique, and was summoned to Grace Road, where Geary helped tune his action. He made his debut against Cambridge University at Fenner's in 1952, taking one wicket. He took as many as 80 wickets in his debut season, albeit at fairly high cost, and was selected for the 1953 Test Trial, in which he bowled Peter May, Denis Compton, Reg Simpson and Trevor Bailey. Unusual in being able to play fairly regularly during his National Service served at nearby Glen Parva, Spencer became a stalwart in a usually weak side. Claiming over 100 wickets once (119 in 1961), he passed 80 in a season a further six times. His finest hour was in 1954, in the tied Championship match against Yorkshire at Huddersfield, Spencer captured his career best 9/63 in the second innings with what Wisden called "grand swing bowling". With the scores level off the last ball he tried to steal a single, but the bowler Johnny Wardle picked up and threw down the stumps at the non-striker's end. A useful hitter, he passed fifty seven times including an innings of 90 against Essex at Grace Road. He scored over 400 runs in a season eight times.

== Comeback ==
Spencer retired in 1969 but was brought back by Ray Illingworth and after playing regularly for two seasons, he played intermittently in First Class and List A matches until a final championship appearance at the end of 1974 against Essex at Chelmsford. Spencer was part of Leicestershire's 1972 Benson & Hedges cup-winning team. He played his final match for the county in a Benson and Hedges group match against Hampshire at Grace Road when several players were struck down with flu. He was 45 at the time. He managed Leicestershire‘a 2nd XI and under-25 teams, playing a role in the development of David Gower, Nigel Briers and James Whitaker, before deciding to become an umpire.
He was on the First Class umpires list from 1979 until the end of 1983, and continued to Umpire Second Eleven matches until 1990.
