= Aubrey Sharp =

English cricketer (1889–1973)

Personal information
- Full name: Aubrey Temple Sharp
- Born: 23 March 1889; Whitwick, Leicestershire, England
- Died: 15 February 1973 (aged 83); Leicester, Leicestershire, England
- Batting: Right-handed
- Role: Batsman
- Relatives: John Sharp (son)

Domestic team information
- Years: Team
- 1908–1935: Leicestershire
- FC debut: 10 August 1908 Leicestershire v MCC
- Last FC: 14 June 1935 Leicestershire v Glamorgan

Career statistics
Competition	First-class
Matches	131
Runs scored	5,263
Batting average	25.67
100s/50s	8/18
Top score	216
Balls bowled	84
Wickets	0
Bowling average	–
5 wickets in innings	–
10 wickets in match	–
Best bowling	–
Catches/stumpings	66/–
- Source: CricketArchive, 7 September 2013

Aubrey Temple Sharp (23 March 1889 – 15 February 1973) was an English cricketer who played first-class cricket for Leicestershire County Cricket Club between 1908 and 1935. He was born at Whitwick, Leicestershire and died at Leicester.

Sharp played as a right-handed middle-order batsman; as an amateur, he acted as captain of Leicestershire many times over his long career, and was official captain in 1921 and for part of 1922. A solicitor, Sharp never played a full season, but he appeared in first-class matches in every season from 1908 to 1935 with the exception of 1925. Most of his first-class cricket was concentrated into the years either side of the First World War: from 1926 onwards, he played in most years just one or two matches and he passed 50 only once in the 10 seasons before his very last appearance in 1935.

Sharp was educated at Repton School where he was in 1908 a member of a cricket team that was rated by Wisden Cricketers' Almanack as the best school side for many years: that season, Sharp made his debut for Leicestershire, and his school team-mates Harry Altham, Richard Sale and Bill Greswell also played county cricket after the school term ended. Sharp made little impact in his early seasons and even in 1910, when he played in 15 games, a season's total that he never exceeded, he made only 414 runs at an average of 18.00, with two scores of more than 50.

In 1911, he played what Wisden termed "the innings of his life" by scoring 216 in the match against Derbyshire at Chesterfield; it did indeed prove to be the highest of his first-class career. He made his first 50 runs in 105 minutes, but then raced to 216 in 250 minutes, scoring two fives and 37 fours and putting on 262 for the sixth wicket with Gustavus Fowke, which remained the Leicestershire record for this wicket until beaten by Phil Simmons and Paul Nixon in 1996. Despite this achievement, Wisden noted that "in fourteen more attempts he scored only about 150 runs, so that his one big performance must be taken as promise rather than a proof of first-rate ability". That analysis proved correct: in 30 further matches in the three seasons up the First World War Sharp passed 50 only twice and did not score another century.

Sharp's best years as a batsman in first-class cricket came in the four seasons from 1919. In the limited first-class programme of the first post-war season in 1919, he scored 716 runs at an average of 42.11, "a marked improvement on his best form in previous seasons," Wisden wrote. He had a poor season in 1920, but in the following year, as captain of the side, he made 879 runs at an average of 41.85 and scored four centuries, half the total of his entire career. His highest innings of the season, 150 in the match against Sussex, helped Leicestershire to avoid the follow on and then to achieve a remarkable victory after they had trailed by 141 runs on the first innings. Sharp was re-elected as captain for 1922, and averaged 54 with the bat, but was unable to play in most of the team's matches and handed over the captaincy to Fowke mid-season. Thereafter, he was an occasional rather than regular cricketer, though he continued to play through to 1935 and captained the team in his last first-class match.

Even after his 27-year first-class career, Sharp was not finished with county cricket: he made non-first-class appearances for Leicestershire in wartime county games right through to 1945, when he was 56 years of age. Sharp's son John played four matches for Leicestershire (and one for Cambridge University) between 1937 and 1946, making his debut just two years after his father's last match: John Sharp went on to become a senior British Army officer and was knighted.

Aubrey Sharp died in 1973 at the age of 83 as a result of a car accident.
