= St Andrew's Church, Whissendine =

Church in Whissendine, Rutland

Coordinates: 52°43′12″N 0°46′05″W

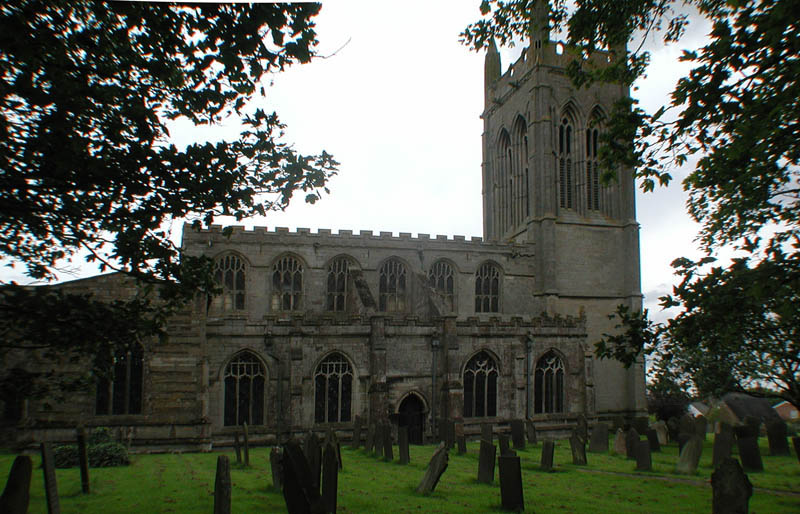
- Denomination: Church of England

History
- Dedication: St Andrew

Administration
- Diocese: Peterborough
- Parish: Whissendine, Rutland

Clergy
- Rector: Stephen Griffiths
- Vicar(s): Deborah Marsh

St Andrew's Church is a church in Whissendine, Rutland. It is a Grade I listed building.

== History ==
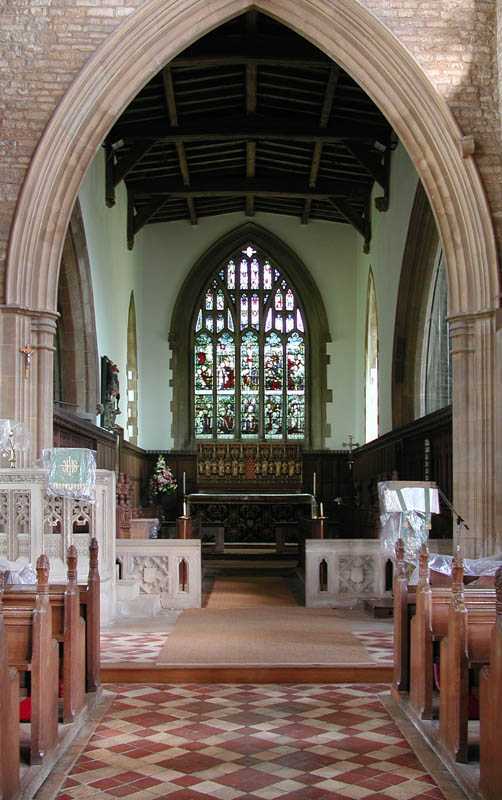
East end

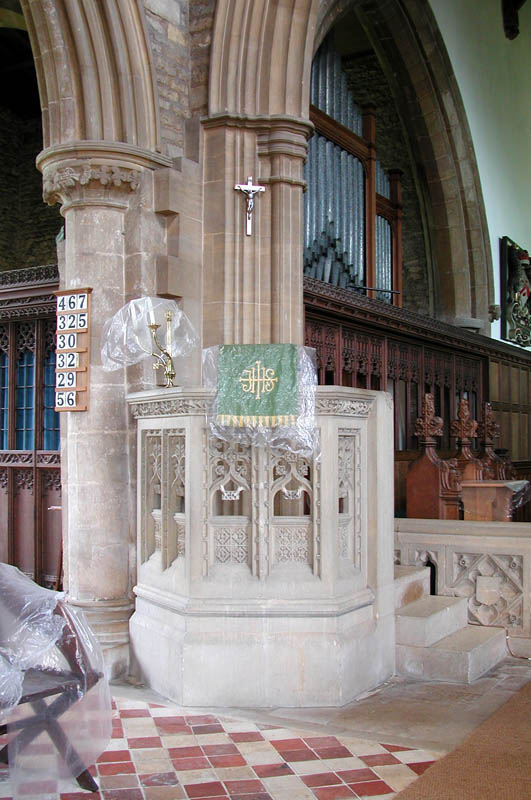
Pulpit

The church is one of the largest in Rutland and has a perpendicular tower. The earliest parts of the church date from the 13th century.

The tower is 14th century, and evidence suggests that it could have been used as a watchtower.

The 14th-century font was defaced at some point. The clerestory was built in the 15th century but was so heavy it caused the nave pillars to shift. Strengthening arches were built to stop the building from collapsing. A statue to St Barbara, by Edwin Lutyens stands in the north aisle.

The early 16th-century screen to the Lady Chapel was brought here from the old chapel of St John's College, Cambridge during the 1867 – 1870 restoration by George Gilbert Scott who had recently built the new college chapel.

A wall memorial to Lady Abigail Sherard is in the chancel. It was found in several different pieces and had to be put together again.
