= Robin Peterson =

South African cricketer (born 1979)

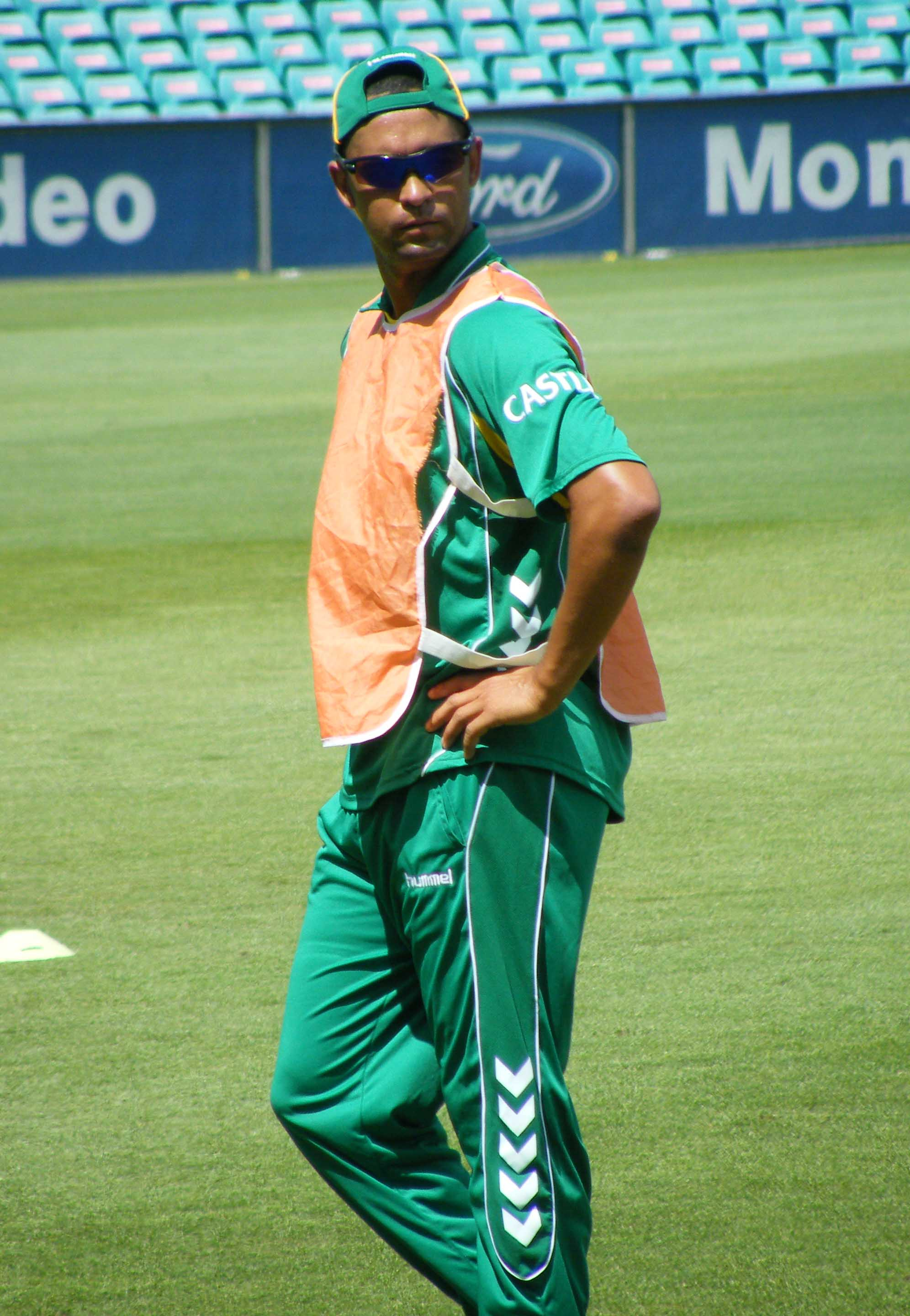

Personal information
- Born: 4 August 1979 (age 47); Port Elizabeth, Cape Province, South Africa
- Batting: Left-handed
- Bowling: Slow left arm orthodox
- Role: All rounder

International information
- National side: South Africa (2002–2014)
- Test debut (cap 291): 1 May 2003 v Bangladesh
- Last Test: 12 February 2014 v Australia
- ODI debut (cap 70): 25 September 2002 v India
- Last ODI: 23 November 2014 v Australia
- ODI shirt no.: 13
- T20I debut (cap 22): 24 February 2006 v Australia
- Last T20I: 9 November 2014 v Australia
- T20I shirt no.: 13

Domestic team information
- Years: Team
- 1997–2004: Eastern Province Warriors
- 2004–2009: Warriors
- 2009–?: Cape Cobras
- 2010: Derbyshire (squad no. 5)
- 2012: Mumbai Indians
- 2014: Surrey
- 2015: Chittagong Vikings

Career statistics
Competition	Test	ODIs	FC	LA
Matches	15	79	144	224
Runs scored	464	556	4,668	2,965
Batting average	27.29	20.59	24.69	24.30
100s/50s	0/3	0/1	6/18	1/16
Top score	84	68	130	101
Balls bowled	2,515	3,278	25,986	9,563
Wickets	38	75	396	257
Bowling average	37.26	35.73	33.28	28.64
5 wickets in innings	1	0	17	5
10 wickets in match	0	0	1	0
Best bowling	5/33	4/12	6/67	7/24
Catches/stumpings	9/–	28/–	69/–	81/–
- Source: ESPNcricinfo, 3 April 2024

Robin John Peterson (born 4 August 1979) is a former South African cricketer who bowls left-arm spin and is a capable batsman. He has played 15 Tests and over 70 ODIs for South Africa. He announced his retirement from all forms of cricket on 9 November 2016.

== Domestic career ==
In December 2009, it was revealed that Peterson had signed up with Derbyshire on a Kolpak contract.

He attended Alexander Road High School in Port Elizabeth and matriculated in 1997.

He was bought by the Mumbai Indians in the 2012 Indian Premier League players auction for $100,000.

== International career ==
He holds the dubious distinction of being the bowler from whom Brian Lara scored a tally of 28 runs in a single Test match over, a world record at the time.

He was the last bowler to dismiss Ricky Ponting in Test cricket, having him caught at slip by Jacques Kallis after Ponting made just 8 runs in his final Test innings. In 2013, Peterson conceded 35 runs in an over during an ODI against Sri Lanka, Thisara Perera striking 34 runs in boundaries with one wide delivery.

=== ICC World Cup 2011 ===
Peterson's 4 for 12 versus Bangladesh is his best bowling performance in ODIs, surpassing his 3 for 22 against England in Chennai. He also hit a quickfire 21 to help his team win against India. He finished the tournament as the highest South African wicket-taker of the tournament with 15 wickets at an average of 15.86 runs.

Sporting positions
Preceded by Nathan Hauritz	Nelson Cricket Club professional 2006	Succeeded by Craig McMillan
Preceded by Craig McMillan	Nelson Cricket Club professional 2009	Succeeded by Burton de Wett
