= John Sharp (British Army officer) =

British Army general (1917–1977)

General Sir John Sharp KCB MC*
- Born: 6 September 1917; Blaby, Leicestershire, England
- Died: 15 January 1977 (aged 59); Oslo, Norway
- Relatives: Aubrey Sharp (father)
- Military career
- Allegiance: United Kingdom
- Branch: British Army
- Service years: 1938–1977
- Rank: General
- Service number: 76719
- Unit: Royal Artillery
- Commands: Allied Forces Northern Europe; I Corps; Staff College, Camberley; 2nd Infantry Division; 11th Infantry Brigade; 1st Regiment Royal Horse Artillery
- Conflicts: Second World War
- Awards: Knight Commander of the Order of the Bath; Military Cross & Bar

General Sir John Aubrey Taylor Sharp, KCB, MC & Bar (6 September 1917 – 15 January 1977) was a British Army officer who achieved high office in the 1970s.

== Military career ==
Sharp was educated at Repton School and Jesus College, Cambridge. He was commissioned into the Royal Artillery in 1938. He served in the Second World War with 5th Medium Regiment and then with the 4th Regiment, Royal Horse Artillery. He was awarded the Military Cross in 1942, and a bar to the award in 1943, both "in recognition of gallant and distinguished services in the Middle East." He went to the Staff College, Quetta, in India in 1944 and then became Personal Liaison Officer to Field Marshal Sir Bernard Montgomery in 1945.

After the war Sharp became an instructor at the Royal Military Academy, Sandhurst, in 1947, advancing to Military Assistant to the Commander-in-Chief, Far East Land Forces in 1955. He became commanding officer of the 1st Regiment Royal Horse Artillery in 1959 and commander of the 11th Infantry Brigade Group in 1961. He went to the Imperial Defence College in 1963 and then became commandant of the Royal School of Artillery at Larkhill in 1964. He was appointed General Officer Commanding 2nd Division in the British Army of the Rhine in 1966 and commandant of the Staff College, Camberley, in 1967.

Sharp was General Officer Commanding I Corps in 1970, Military Secretary in 1972 and lastly Commander-in-Chief, Allied Forces Northern Europe from 1974 up to his death in Oslo on 15 January 1977. In that capacity he had to deal with threats to Europe's northern flank from the Soviet Union.

== Cricket ==
Sharp played first-class cricket for Leicestershire and the University of Cambridge in five matches between 1937 and 1946. His father, Aubrey Sharp, was a cricketer of greater renown, appearing in first-class cricket for Leicestershire between 1908 and 1935 and captaining the team in 1921 and part of 1922.

Military offices
Preceded by Norman Wheeler	General Officer Commanding 2nd Division; 1966−1967	Succeeded by Chandos Blair
Preceded by Mervyn Butler	Commandant of the Staff College, Camberley; 1967−1970	Succeeded by Allan Taylor
Preceded by Sir Mervyn Butler	General Officer Commanding 1st (British) Corps; 1970−1971	Succeeded by Sir Roland Gibbs
Preceded by Sir Thomas Pearson	Military Secretary; 1972−1974	Succeeded by Sir Patrick Howard-Dobson
Preceded by Sir Thomas Pearson	Commander-in-Chief Allied Forces Northern Europe; 1974−1977	Succeeded by Sir Peter Whiteley
