= Whissendine Brook =

River in Leicestershire and Rutland, England

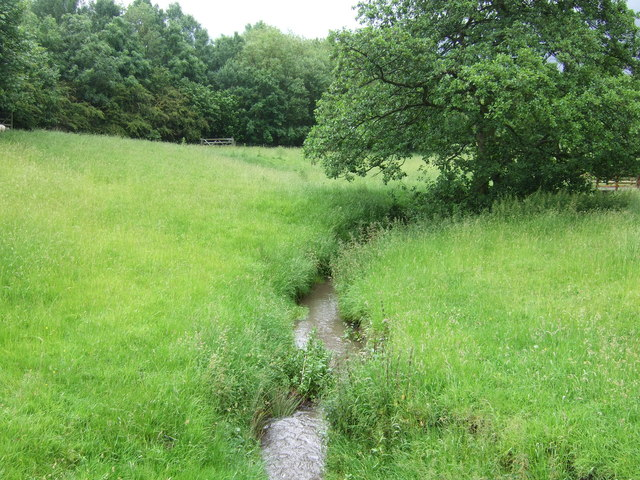
- The brook upstream of Whissendine

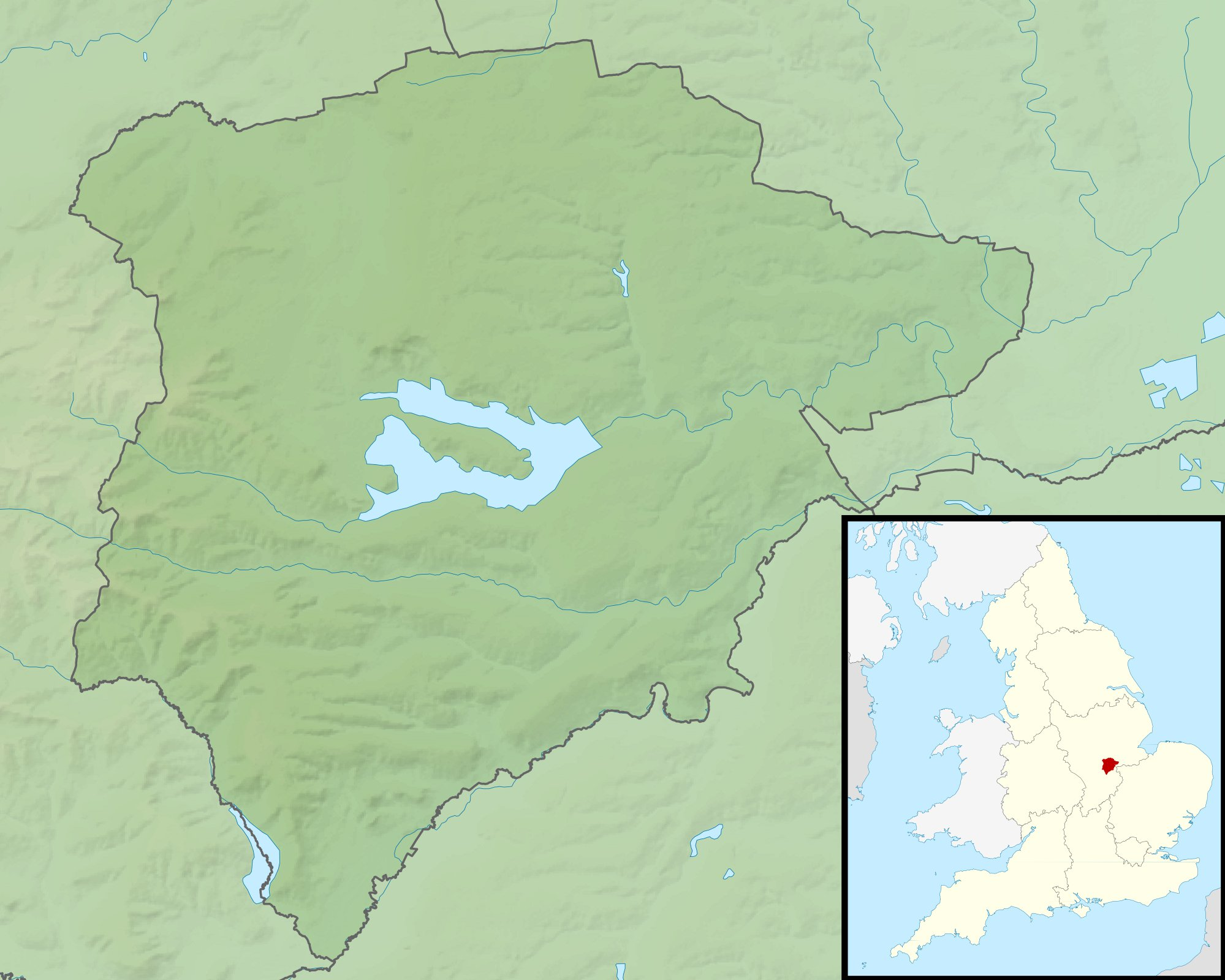
- Location of the river mouth in Rutland

Location
- Country: England
- Counties: Rutland, Leicestershire

Physical characteristics
- Source
  - location: Cold Overton, Leicestershire
  - coordinates: 52.682448°N 0.806718°W
  - elevation: 182 m (597 ft)
- Mouth: Langham Brook
  - location: Whissendine, Rutland
  - coordinates: 52.741364°N 0.765782°W
  - elevation: 94 m (308 ft)
- Length: 10.5 km (6.5 mi)
- Basin size: 14.4 km^{2} (5.6 sq mi)

The Whissendine Brook is a small watercourse in the East Midlands region of England. It is a tributary of the Langham Brook and part of the River Soar catchment.

== Course ==
The Whissendine Brook rises to the west of Cold Overton in Leicestershire and flows in a north easterly direction past the village and across the county boundary into Rutland. From here it continues through a gentle valley, splitting the village of Whissendine into two distinct halves, with the older settlement on higher ground to the east and a larger collection of more modern houses around a restored 19th century windmill to the west.

In the centre of the village, it is joined by a smaller tributary from the south at a location formerly known as Horse Pit Lane where the brook was used to wash horses and carts. In periods of heavy rain, it regularly floods at this point.

Upon leaving the village, it continues to flow north through arable fields where it soon joins the Langham Brook back on the border of Leicestershire.

== Status ==
In 2016, the overall classification of the Whissendine Brook was 'Poor' under the Water Framework Directive for reasons of sewage contamination, poor livestock management and poor nutrient management in the agricultural land surrounding it.
