= Burton de Wett =

South African cricketer (born 1980)

Personal information
- Full name: Burton Christopher de Wett
- Born: 25 December 1980 (age 45); East London, South Africa
- Batting: Left-handed
- Bowling: Leg break

Domestic team information
- Years: Team
- 2000–2001: North West
- 2001–2007: Border
- 2005–2007: Warriors
- 2007–: South Western Districts
- First-class debut: 1 March 2001 North West v Western Province
- List A debut: 5 January 2001 North West v Free State

Career statistics
Competition	First-class	List A
Matches	83	76
Runs scored	4063	1698
Batting average	27.63	25.72
100s/50s	7/20	1/10
Top score	182	108*
Balls bowled	4296	646
Wickets	75	17
Bowling average	36.38	31.64
5 wickets in innings	3	0
10 wickets in match	0	0
Best bowling	7–95	3–19
Catches/stumpings	62/–	29/–
- Source: CricketArchive, 29 March 2012

Burton Christopher de Wett (born 25 December 1980) is a South African professional cricketer. He is a left-handed batsman, and also bowls leg break. He currently plays first-class cricket for the South Western Districts cricket team.

For the 2010 season, de Wett was the professional for Nelson Cricket Club in the Lancashire League.

Sporting positions
Preceded by Robin Peterson	Nelson Cricket Club professional 2010	Succeeded by Luke Woodcock
