= Bill Shipman =

English cricketer

Personal information
- Full name: William Shipman
- Born: 1 March 1886; Ratby, England
- Died: 26 August 1943 (aged 57); Ratby, England
- Batting: Right-handed
- Bowling: Right-arm fast

Domestic team information
- Years: Team
- 1908–1921: Leicestershire
- First-class debut: 13 July 1908 Leicestershire v Essex
- Last First-class: 30 July 1921 Leicestershire v Northamptonshire

Career statistics
Competition	FC
Matches	111
Runs scored	2474
Batting average	14.30
100s/50s	0/6
Top score	69
Balls bowled	16647
Wickets	366
Bowling average	27.21
5 wickets in innings	16
10 wickets in match	3
Best bowling	9/83
Catches/stumpings	82/–
- Source: Cricket Archive, 16 March 2011

William Shipman (1 March 1886 – 26 August 1943) was an English cricketer who played over 100 first-class matches for Leicestershire. A right-arm fast bowler, he took 366 wickets during his 13-year career, at an average of 27.21. Shipman was a lower-order batsman and scored a total of 2,474 runs, with an average score of 14.30. Shipman played 110 of his 111 matches for Leicestershire between 1908 and 1914, but returned to make a single appearance for the county in the summer of 1921.

== Biography ==
Shipman was born in the village of Ratby, Leicestershire on 1 March 1886. He was one of three brothers who played cricket for Leicestershire; Alan Shipman played almost 400 matches for the county, while Albert Shipman appeared in seven matches for the second XI during the 1914 season. He died in Ratby on 26 August 1943, at the age of 57.

== Cricket career ==
Shipman began his Leicestershire career in the summer of 1908 and took four wickets on his County Championship debut in the drawn match against Essex in July of that year. Throughout the next five seasons, he was an almost ever-present for the county. Shipman attained personal-best figures of 9–83 against Surrey in September 1910, and went on to bowl three ten-wicket hauls in his career. His form for Leicestershire earned him appearances in two Test trial matches in the 1911 season; one for The Rest against the England Test side, and one for Gilbert Jessop's XI against a team selected by Plum Warner. In August 1911, Shipman scored 69 runs, his highest ever in a first-class match, in the County Championship defeat to Warwickshire. He scored half-centuries on six occasions during his career.

For the 1915 season, Shipman was the club professional for Nelson Cricket Club in the Lancashire League. He scored 417 runs and took 77 wickets during his time at Seedhill. In July 1921, after a seven-year absence from the Leicestershire team, Shipman returned to play his final first-class game for the county, taking six wickets in the win against Northamptonshire at Aylestone Road.
