= Whissendine =

Village in Rutland, England

Coordinates: 52.720°N 0.771°W

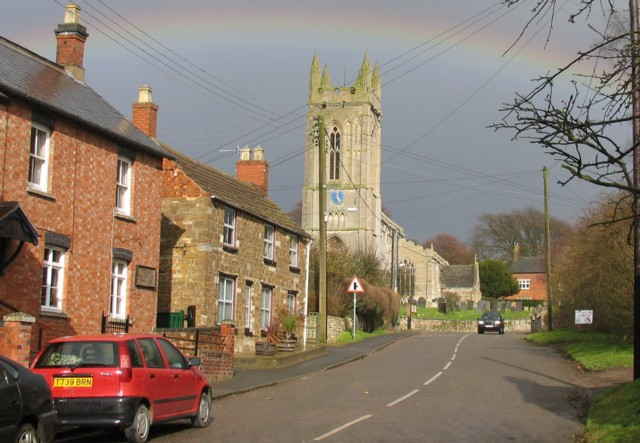
- St Andrew's Church, Whissendine

- Location within Rutland
- Area: 6.30 sq mi (16.3 km^{2})
- Population: 1,189 2001 Census
  - Density: 189/sq mi (73/km^{2})
- OS grid reference: SK8314
  - London: 89 miles (143 km) SSE
- Unitary authority: Rutland
- Shire county: Rutland
- Ceremonial county: Rutland
- Region: East Midlands
- Country: England
- Sovereign state: United Kingdom
- Post town: Oakham
- Postcode district: LE15
- Dialling code: 01664
- Police: Leicestershire
- Fire: Leicestershire
- Ambulance: East Midlands
- UK Parliament: Rutland and Stamford
- Website: Welcome to Whissendine

Whissendine is a village and civil parish in Rutland, England, north-west of the county town, Oakham. The population at the 2001 census was 1,189, increasing to 1,253 at the 2011 census.

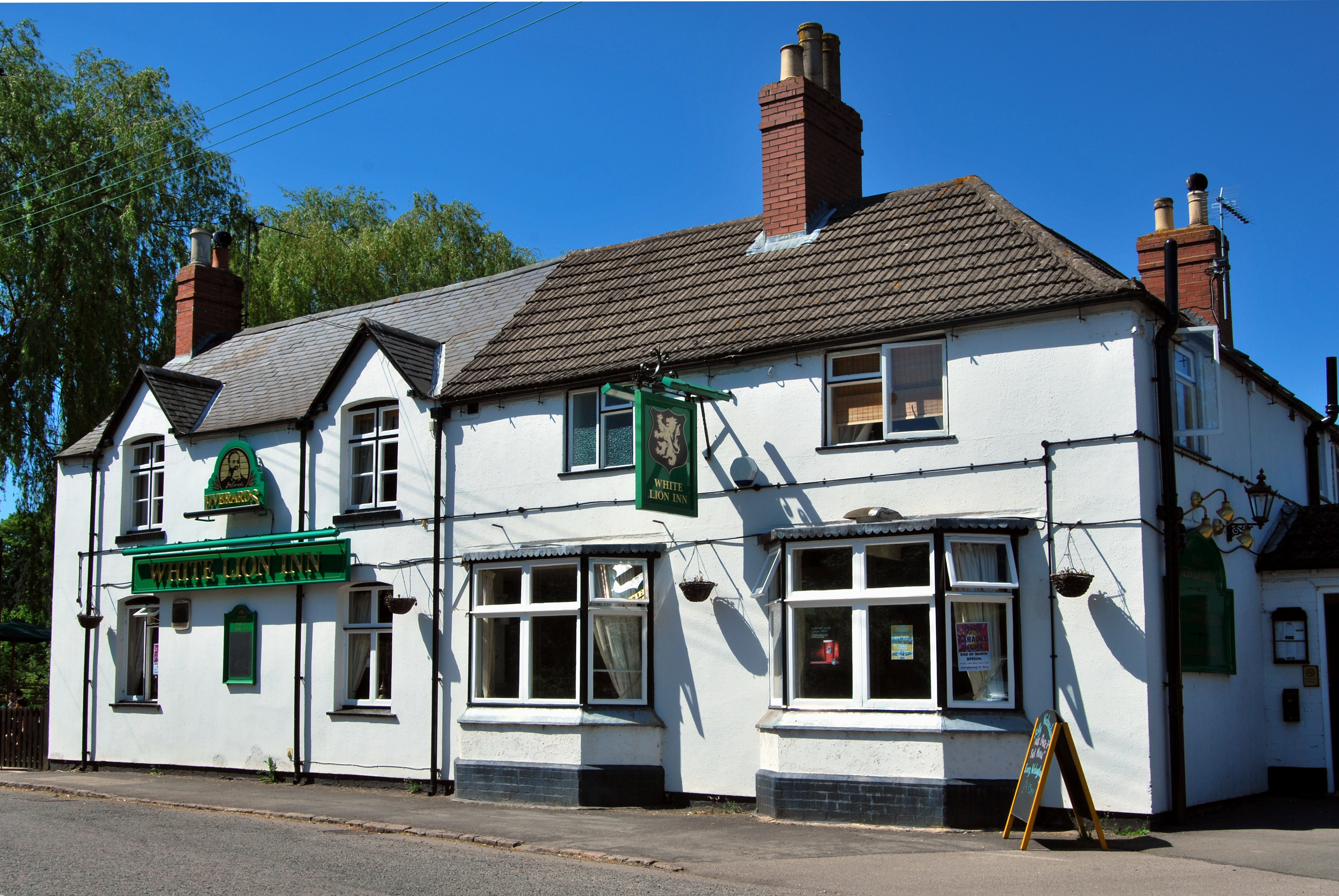
The White Lion public house

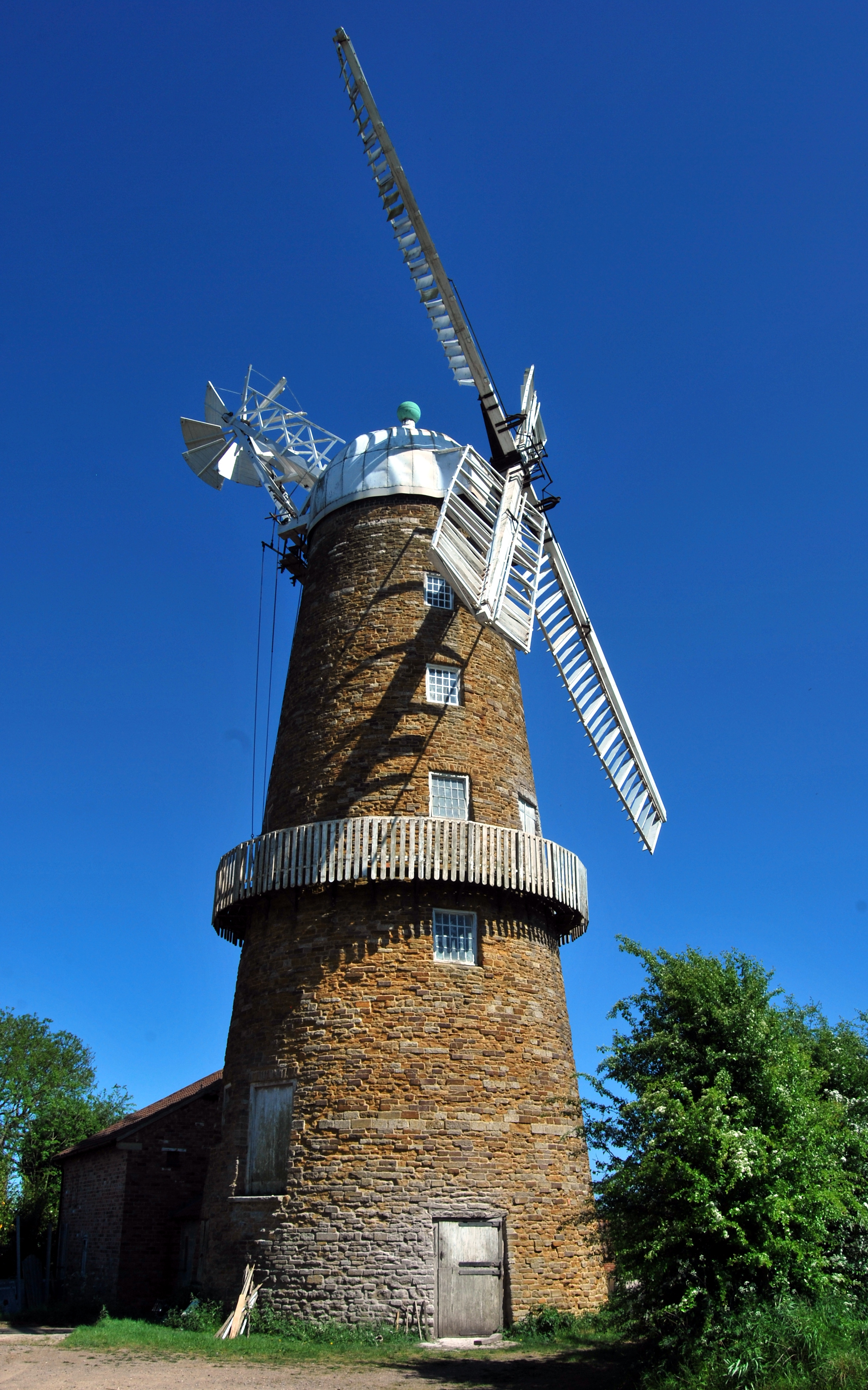
Whissendine Windmill

The village's name either means 'valley of Hwicce' or 'valley of the people of Hwicci'. Alternatively, perhaps 'valley of the pirates'.

It has a pub, The White Lion; a Church of England parish church and a working windmill. The Methodist chapel closed in 2009, the last service being held on 30 August.

Whissendine Windmill was built in 1809 and returned to milling in September 2006. The windmill is a Grade II* listed building and is said to be the tallest stone windmill in the country.

St Andrew's Church, Whissendine, was built in the 13th century and has a 14th-century tower. The screen to the Lady Chapel was brought here from the old chapel of St John's College, Cambridge during the 1870 restoration by George Gilbert Scott. St Andrew's is a Grade I listed building.

Whissendine Church of England Primary School is in the middle of the village.

The Village Hall hosts many events throughout the year including antiques fairs and the village pantomime. Each year in late June, the village hosts a "feast week", an ancient custom from the Middle Ages that has been reintroduced and entails a week of activities for the community. This includes a 6-mile run, a UK Athletics licensed race, the Feast week extravaganza, the knockout and the fete on the green.

The village also has a sports club that has a cricket team, football pitch, tennis club, archery club and a bowling green.

The pasture called The Banks is still let by ancient custom. This involves a candle in which a pin is stuck is lit and the last bidder before the pin falls is entitled to rent The Banks for the ensuing year.

The village had a scout troop up until 2010 and a cub pack until 2012.

The village is on the Rutland Round, the circular walk around Britain's smallest county.

In 2019, the parish was the location of an unlicensed rave reported to have been attended by 700 people.

== Local figures ==
Edward Horne (1835 – 1908), clergyman and cricketer, died at Whissendine. He was vicar from 1864 until he retired in 1906; he remained in the village and died there two years later.

Richard Kettle (1813 - 1915), born in Whissendine, was an early farming pioneer in Helidon, Queensland, Australia, with his family. His family may have emigrated to Australia when, after the death of Lord Harborough, the estate, with the village, was split up in 1861 and the tenants had the opportunity to buy their farms and cottages.

Horace Snary (1897 – 1966) played first-class cricket for Leicestershire between 1921 and 1933. He was born in and retired to Whissendine, where he farmed.

British photo colouriser and model maker Tom Marshall grew up in the village.

Musician Sam Carter grew up in Whissendine and attended Whissendine Primary School and Vale of Catmose College. His song 'Station Road' is about the road in the village.

== In popular culture ==
"Whissendine" is the title of a song by the band Crippled Black Phoenix

== See also ==
- Whissendine Brook
