= Seedhill Cricket Ground =

Cricket stadium in Nelson, Lancashire, England

Coordinates: 53°50′27.19″N 2°13′20.56″W

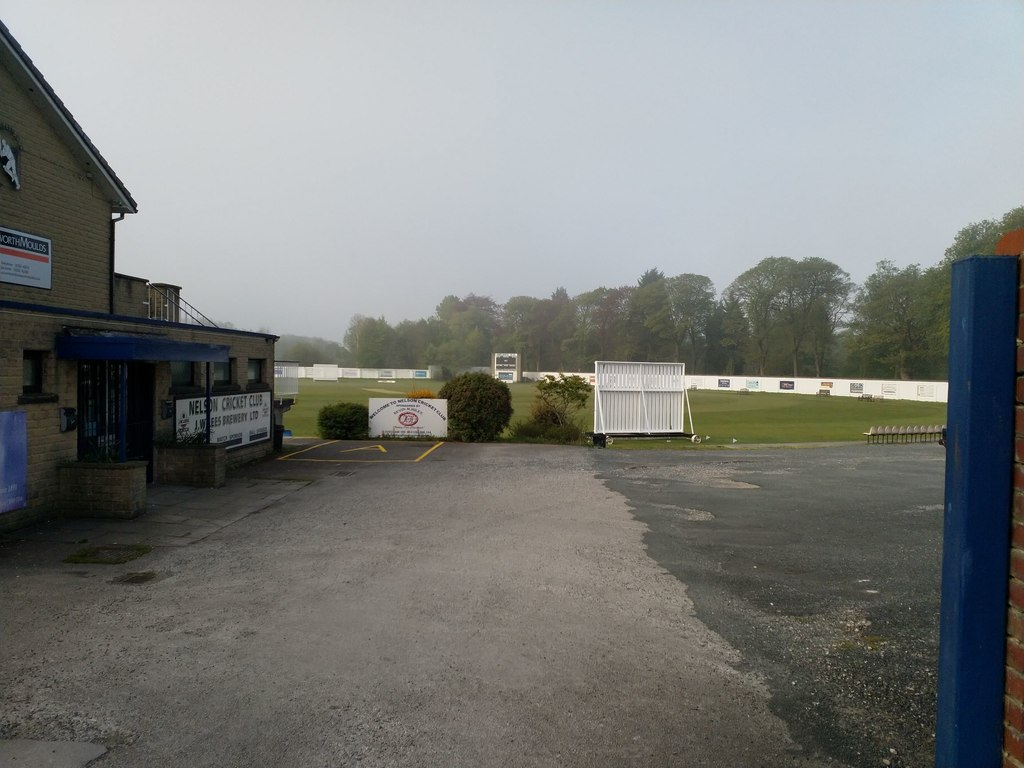
View across the cricket ground (2019)

The Seedhill Cricket Ground is a small cricket stadium in the English town of Nelson, Lancashire. It is the home of Lancashire League cricket team Nelson Cricket Club. It is situated near to Seedhill Football Ground, the former home of North West Counties League Division One side Nelson F.C. and its home during its period in the Football League from 1921 to 1931, during which time it won the Third Division North title in 1922-23 and played in the then Second Division the following season.

The ground hosted nine of Lancashire's first-class matches (all in the County Championship) between 1925 and 1938. In 2001 it staged its only List A game, when the Lancashire Cricket Board lost to the Yorkshire Cricket Board in the first round of the C&G Trophy.
