= Alan Shipman =

English cricketer

Personal information
- Full name: Alan Wilfred Shipman
- Born: 7 March 1901; Ratby, England
- Died: 12 December 1979 (aged 78); Leicester, England
- Batting: Right-handed
- Bowling: Right-arm fast

Domestic team information
- Years: Team
- 1920–1936: Leicestershire

Career statistics
Competition	FC
Matches	386
Runs scored	13682
Batting average	23.23
100s/50s	15/65
Top score	226
Balls bowled	36797
Wickets	607
Bowling average	25.36
5 wickets in innings	16
10 wickets in match	0
Best bowling	7/63
Catches/stumpings	97/–
- Source: Cricinfo, 27 December 2007

Alan Wilfred Shipman (7 March 1901, Ratby, Leicestershire – 12 December 1979) was a first-class cricketer for Leicestershire between 1920 and 1936. As an all-rounder, he batted right-handed, and was a right-handed fast-bowler between 1920 and 1936. Over 386 first-class matches (661 innings), Shipman scored 13682 runs, at an average of 23.22, with 15 centuries, and a top score of 226.

In 1921, The Cricketer said "Shipman, of Leicestershire, is a cricketer with a future. Only twenty years of age, he bowls fast right hand with an easy run up to the crease and an excellent action. At present, he is rather weedy in build, but if he could put on a stone or two – we recommend a course of physical training during the winter – he might well develop into an England bowler".

As a bowler, he took 607 wickets, at an average of 25.36 with 16 five wicket hauls. His brother, Bill Shipman, also played first-class cricket for Leicestershire. In 1928, he represented the Players in the Gentlemen v Players fixture.
