= Norman Armstrong =

English cricketer (1892–1990)

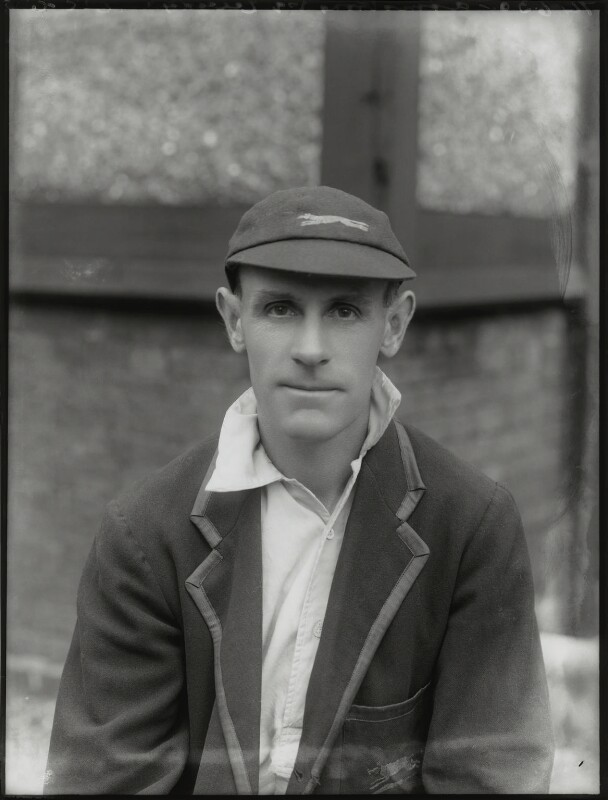
- Armstrong in 1931

Personal information
- Full name: Norman Foster Armstrong
- Born: 22 December 1892; Loughborough, Leicestershire, England
- Died: 19 January 1990 (aged 97); Branksome, Poole, Dorset
- Nickname: The Valiant Armstrong
- Batting: Right-handed
- Bowling: Right-arm medium-pace change bowler
- Role: Batsman

Domestic team information
- Years: Team
- 1919–39: Leicestershire
- First-class debut: 15 August 1919 Leicestershire v Nottinghamshire
- Last First-class: 31 August 1939 Leicestershire v Derbyshire

Career statistics
Competition	First-class
Matches	386
Runs scored	19001
Batting average	32.98
100s/50s	36/100
Top score	186
Balls bowled	9975
Wickets	110
Bowling average	40.53
5 wickets in innings	–
10 wickets in match	–
Best bowling	4/21
Catches/stumpings	225/–
- Source: CricketArchive, 4 July 2013

Norman Foster Armstrong (22 December 1892 – 19 January 1990) was an English first-class cricketer who played for Leicestershire between 1919 and 1939. He was born in Loughborough, Leicestershire and died at Branksome, Poole, Dorset.

Armstrong was a right-handed middle-order batsman and an irregular right-arm medium-pace bowler. He came rather late to first-class cricket, playing just a single match in the 1919 season and then not re-appearing until 1926, when he was 33. He then played for the first team regularly right up to the start of the Second World War, when he was 46, and even re-appeared in non-first-class matches played at the end of the war in 1945, when he was 52. Every single one of his 386 first-class games was played for Leicestershire; his period of greatest success came after he was 40 and he was never selected for a representative game of any kind.

== Cricket career ==
After Armstrong's single unsuccessful appearance as an amateur in 1919, he disappeared into club cricket in Loughborough, but in 1924 he re-emerged in a single match as an all-rounder as Leicestershire entered its second team in the Minor Counties competition, though he was injured in the game. The establishment of a second team in the Minor Counties was part of a series of moves intended to produce a stronger team for what had traditionally been one of the weaker English counties; the moves included the appointment of the club's first full-time coach, the former Surrey and England player Ernie Hayes, and the recruitment of new professionals. Armstrong was cited then and later as a player who had benefited from this coaching and the more professional set-up.

In 1926, he was taken on to the county staff and though he made only one score of more than 50, Wisden Cricketers' Almanack noted that "he did sufficient to suggest that for him the future has considerable possibilities".

A year later, Wisden was able to report that "Armstrong so fully realised the promise given during his first season with the county that he added 500 runs to his aggregate, and ten to his average, besides getting his first 100 and exceeding the 1,000 in all matches". The century was 113 not out against Northamptonshire made in 225 minutes. It was the first of 36 career centuries, all of them made for Leicestershire and the 1013 runs he made in 1927 were followed by 12 further seasons in which he exceeded 1000 runs.

Armstrong moved up to bat at No 3 in 1928 and retained that place in the batting order for the next 12 seasons. Against Yorkshire he took 400 minutes to score 186 as Wilfred Rhodes bowled 69.3 overs to take six wickets for 169 runs; but Leicestershire made Yorkshire follow on and that in games between those two teams was seen as a triumph for Leicestershire. He topped the Leicestershire batting averages in that season and did so again in four other years: 1933, 1934, 1935 and 1939.

In 1933, at the age of 40, Armstrong became the first Leicestershire player to score more than 2,000 runs in a season when he made 2112 runs at an average of 43.10. It was a very poor season for Leicestershire and they finished bottom of the County Championship for the first time (they had been jointly at the bottom twice before). Leicestershire's improvement and a slightly wetter season accounted for a fall in his aggregate in 1934 – he played 10 fewer innings in the season than he had in 1933 – but he maintained his average at 42.52. He averaged more than 40 again in 1937, though Les Berry was higher in the averages, and in 1939 he was top of the Leicestershire table again, though once more it was in a season when the county finished at the bottom of the Championship.

Armstrong played fairly regularly in and around Leicester during the Second World War and appeared in some non-first-class county matches in 1945 when the war was over. But when first-class cricket resumed in 1946 he was 53 and he did not play again. At the time of his death in 1990, he was recorded as the second-oldest surviving first-class cricketer.

== Cricket style ==
Armstrong's first century in 1927 took 225 minutes and his highest career score of 186 a year later stretched over more than six-and-a-half hours, but at that stage in his career he was not thought of as a dour batsman: "Attractive in style, his offside play was enterprising without being unduly risky," Wisden noted in 1928. Six years later, after Armstrong had enjoyed his most successful season with the bat and become the first Leicestershire player to score 2000 runs in a season, the praise was less wholehearted: "While Armstrong could not in any sense be termed a stylish batsman," Wisden wrote, "his extremely sound defence proved very valuable among so many unreliable run-getters." There are similar comments in several other issues of Wisden across the 1930s.

The only note of dissent from this came in the report of Leicestershire's cricket in what proved to be Armstrong's last season, 1939, when he was 46. "The batting never rose to great heights but the complete change of style shown by Armstrong came as a revelation," Wisden reported. "Previously a useful, rigid, defensive batsman, Armstrong last year began bringing off strokes which previously he scarcely ever produced. He played a number of really attractive innings and became the most consistent man on the side."

A later comment in his Wisden obituary reflects in part Armstrong's later role at Leicestershire, when runs were scarce and the money to buy new batsmen was not available. Observing that Armstrong had benefited from Hayes' coaching, it wrote: "His defence, later to become rock-like, was tightened up, but wisely no attempt was made to interfere with his highly idiosyncratic array of scoring strokes on the leg side, of which the most telling was a species of short-arm hook in front of square. For the rest of his runs he relied on a variety of pushes, nudges and prods, executed at the last minute just as the frustrated bowler thought he had broken through."

His obituary in Wisden concluded: "Owing to his inflexible determination at the crease, and the frequency with which he rescued a lost cause in a weak batting side, he came to be known as 'the Valiant Armstrong'."
