= Nelson Cricket Club =

Nelson Cricket Club
League	Lancashire League
Ground	Seedhill, Nelson, Lancashire
Professional	Tyler McGladdery (UK)
2026 League Position	1st

Nelson Cricket Club, based at Seedhill in Nelson, Lancashire, are a cricket club in the Lancashire League. They play at the Seedhill ground in Nelson. Their captain and also professional for the 2026 season was Tyler McGladdery who is UK based. Nelson won Division 2 of the Lancashire League in 2026 on the final day of the season and thereby will play in the ECB Premier Division in 2027.

Nelson Cricket Club was formed in 1861 when two other local clubs merged. It was a founding member of the Lancashire League in 1892, winning the inaugural championship. The club has gone on to win the league on 21 occasions, the most of any club. During this period the club has fielded prominent cricketers such as Learie Constantine, Kapil Dev and Steve Waugh.

== Honours ==
- 1st XI League Winners - 21 - 1892, 1895, 1896, 1903, 1911, 1928, 1929, 1931, 1932, 1934, 1935, 1936, 1937, 1946, 1965, 1967, 1969, 1986, 1994, 1998, 1999, 2026
- Worsley Cup Winners - 9 - 1920, 1926, 1928, 1931, 1934, 1962, 1965, 1995, 2006
- Ron Singleton Colne Trophy - 1 - 2000 (shared)
- 2nd XI League Winners - 15 - 1896, 1909, 1911, 1925 (shared), 1928, 1932, 1956, 1957, 1958, 1990, 1996, 2008, 2009, 2011, 2014
- 2nd XI (Lancashire Telegraph) Cup Winners - 5 - 1994, 2008, 2009, 2013, 2026
- 3rd XI League Winners - 4 - 2003, 2007, 2009, 2013
- Highest 50 overs score - 350-3 Away at Rawtenstall on 4th August 2018

== See also ==
- List of Nelson Cricket Club professionals
