= Packe =

Packe is a surname. Notable people with the surname include:

- Charles Packe (explorer) (1826–1896), British lawyer
- Charles Packe (cricketer) ( 1909–1944), English cricketer
- Charles Packe (MP) (1792–1867), British politician
- Christopher Packe (chemist) (b. in or before 1657, d. in or after 1708), English chemist
- Christopher Packe (politician) (c. 1599–1682), Lord Mayor of London and member of the Drapers Company
- Christopher Packe (painter) (1760–1840), British portrait and landscape painter
- Christopher Packe (physician and cartographer) (1686–1749), English physician and geologist
- Edward Packe (1878–1946), British civil servant
- George Hussey Packe (1796–1874), British politician an army officer present at the Battle of Waterloo
- Horace Packe (1865–1934), Archdeacon of Southland from 1913 until 1922
- Michael Packe (1916–1978), British historian, biographer and cricketer
- Robert Packe (1913–1935), English cricketer

== See also ==
- Pack (disambiguation)
- Packer (disambiguation)
