= List of packing houses =

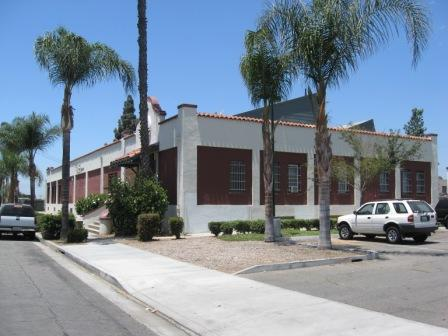
Elephant Packing House, Fullerton, California

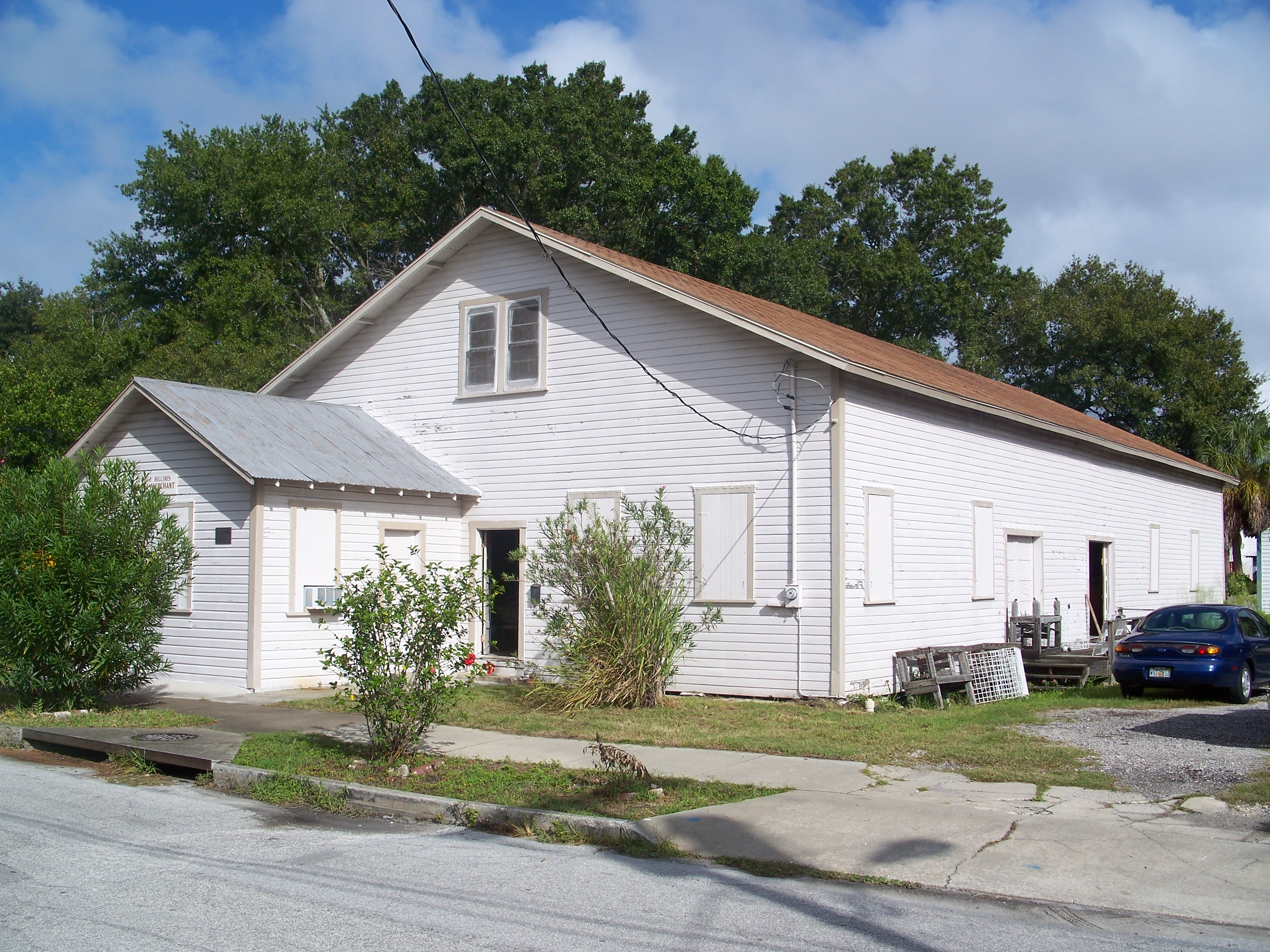
N. G. Arfaras Sponge Packing House, Tarpon Springs, Florida

This is a list of notable packing houses. A packing house is a building where fruits, oysters, or other items are packed for shipping and distribution and there exist thousands of them in agricultural areas.

in England

The main purpose of packing warehouses in England was the picking, checking, labelling and packing of goods for export. The packing warehouses: Asia House, India House and Velvet House along Whitworth Street in Manchester were some of the tallest buildings of their time.

in the United States

A number of historically significant packing houses in the United States are listed on the U.S. National Register of Historic Places.

Notable packing houses include:

- J.C. Rhew Co. Packing Shed, Providence, Arkansas, NRHP-listed
- Anaheim Packing House, Anaheim, California
- Elephant Packing House, Fullerton, California, NRHP-listed
- Frances Packing House, Irvine, California, NRHP-listed
- New York Belting and Packing Co., Newtown, Connecticut, NRHP-listed
- Strawn Historic Citrus Packing House District, DeLeon Springs, Florida, NRHP-listed
- N. G. Arfaras Sponge Packing House, Tarpon Springs, Florida, NRHP-listed
- E. R. Meres Sponge Packing House, Tarpon Springs, Florida, NRHP-listed
- Auburndale Citrus Growers Association Packing House, Auburndale, Florida, NRHP-listed
- Marion S. Whaley Citrus Packing House, Rockledge, Florida, NRHP-listed
- J. C. Palumbo Fruit Company Packing Warehouse Building, Payette, Idaho, NRHP-listed
- Midland Packing Company, Sioux City, Iowa, NRHP-listed
- Rath Packing Company Administration Building, Waterloo, Iowa, NRHP-listed
- Portland Packing Company Factory, Portland, Maine, NRHP-listed
- J. C. Lore Oyster House, Maryland, NRHP-listed
- Mississippi Mills Packing and Shipping Rooms, Wesson, Mississippi, NRHP-listed
- Bivalve Oyster Packing Houses and Docks, Bivalve, New Jersey, NRHP-listed
- Rudolph Oyster House, West Sayville, New York, NRHP-listed
- De Mores Packing Plant Ruins, Medora, North Dakota, NRHP-listed
- Union Fishermen's Cooperative Packing Company Alderbrook Station, Astoria, Oregon, NRHP-listed
- Seacoast Packing Company, Beaufort, South Carolina, NRHP-listed
- The Corner Packing Shed, Frogmore, South Carolina, NRHP-listed
- Earle R. Taylor House and Peach Packing Shed, Greer, South Carolina, NRHP-listed
- Mission Citrus Growers Union Packing Shed, Mission, Texas, NRHP-listed
- Mukai Cold Process Fruit Barrelling Plant, Vashon, Washington, NRHP-listed
- Peter Myers Pork Packing Plant and Willard Coleman Building, Janesville, Wisconsin, NRHP-listed
