= Jetpack (disambiguation) =

A jet pack (or jetpack) is a jet-powered or rocket-powered device, usually worn on the back, that allows a person to fly.

Jetpack or Jetpac may also refer to:

== Arts, entertainment, and media ==
=== Games ===
- Jetpac, a ZX Spectrum videogame released in 1983 by Ultimate Play the Game
- Jetpack (video game), an MS-DOS videogame released in 1993
- Jetpack Joyride, a side-scrolling endless-running arcade video game published by Halfbrick Studios

=== Music ===
- The Nobility, a pop rock band formerly known as Jetpack
- "Jetpack", a song by Flobots from Flobots Present... Platypus

== Computing and technology ==
- JetPack, a Linux-based Software Development Kit (SDK) from Nvidia for their Jetson board series
- Jetpack, a plugin by WordPress.com
- jetpack.exe, a Microsoft Windows command-line utility used to compact a Jet Database
- Jetpack Compose, a Kotlin-based UI development framework for Android
- Martin Jetpack, a personal ducted fan flying machine
- Mozilla Jetpack, a library and API being developed for extensions to the Firefox web browser
- Verizon Jetpack, a brand of mobile hotspot (Wi-Fi)

== See also ==
- Jet (disambiguation)
- Pack (disambiguation)
- Pak (disambiguation)
