= Christopher Packe =

Christopher Packe may refer to:

- Sir Christopher Packe (politician) (c. 1599–1682), appointed Lord Packe under the Protectorate
- Christopher Packe (chemist) (b. in or before 1657, d. in or after 1708), chemical physician
- Christopher Packe (physician and cartographer) (1686–1749), medical doctor and geologist who produced the first geological map of Southern England
- Christopher Packe (painter) (1760–1840), portrait and landscape painter
