= Packer =

Packer or Packers may refer to:

== Equipment ==
- Cultipacker, an agricultural roller
- Garwood Load Packer, an American waste collection vehicle
- Production packer, a standard component of the completion hardware of oil or gas wells used to isolate a section of a borehole

== Movies ==
- The Gun Packer, a 1919 American short silent Western film
- Gun Packer (1938 film), a 1938 American Western film
- The Legend of Alfred Packer, a 1980 American biographical Western film
- The Star Packer, a 1934 American Western film

== Newspapers ==
- Chicago Packer, a newspaper which catered to the interests of commercial growers, produce handlers, and poultry farmers
- The Packer, newspaper and website covering the fresh produce industry

== Occupations ==
- A pack train operator (e.g. outfitter)
- A meat packer
- A household goods packer for moving; see moving company

== People ==
- Packer (surname), includes a list of notable people with this surname
- Packer family, an Australian media and political family
- The Packers, an American soul group
- Todd Packer, fictional character in the American television series The Office

== Places ==
- Packer House (disambiguation), several historic buildings in the US
- Packer Park, a neighborhood in the South Philadelphia section of Philadelphia, Pennsylvania, U.S.
- Packer Township, Pennsylvania, a township in Carbon County, Pennsylvania, U.S.
- Packer's Falls in Durham, New Hampshire, U.S., subject of New Hampshire historical marker no. 154
- Packers Camp, a rural locality in the Cairns Region, Queensland, Australia

== Sports teams ==
- Anderson Packers, a former professional basketball team that played for Anderson, Indiana, in three different leagues, from 1946 to 1951
- Chicago Packers, the former name of the NBA team the Washington Wizards, when they played in Chicago, Illinois, for the 1961–62 NBA season
- Green Bay Packers, an American football team in Green Bay, Wisconsin
- Kansas City Packers, a Federal League baseball team from 1914 to 1915

== Other uses ==
- Operation Packer, a military operation by the South African Defence Force in 1988
- Packer, a phallic object worn to simulate male genitals; see packing (phallus)
- Packer Collegiate Institute, in Brooklyn, New York City
- Packer concentration, market domination within the American meat-packing industry
- Packer's knot, a binding knot
- Packers sweep, an American football play
- Power-Packer, a Netherlands-based producer and distributor of electro-hydraulic motion control systems
- Runtime packer, a software component used to reduce executable sizes

== See also ==
- Pack (disambiguation)
- Packe, a surname
- Packing (disambiguation)
