= Packer House =

Packer House may refer to:

- Alonzo Hamilton Packer House, Safford, Arizona, listed on the National Register of Historic Places (NRHP) in Graham County
- Packer House (Franklin Lakes, New Jersey), NRHP-listed
- Packer Farm and Barkersville Store, Middle Grove, New York, NRHP-listed
- Asa Packer Mansion, Jim Thorpe, Pennsylvania, NRHP-listed
- Harry Packer Mansion, Jim Thorpe, Pennsylvania, NRHP-listed
- Isaac A. Packer Farm, Lock Haven, Pennsylvania, NRHP-listed

== See also ==
- Packing house
- List of packing houses
- Packer (disambiguation)
- Packer Memorial Chapel, Bethlehem, Pennsylvania, NRHP-listed
- Packer's National Bank Building, Omaha, Nebraska, NRHP-listed
