= Gentle Giant (disambiguation) =

Gentle Giant were a British progressive rock band from 1970 to 1980.

Gentle Giant may also refer to:

== Music ==
- Gentle Giant (album), the band's 1970 debut album
- The Gentle Giant, a 1972 album by Yusef Lateef
- Gentle Giant, a 2009 EP and song on the EP by The Nobility
- "Gentle Giant (for Hank)", a track on the 2010 album Let's Touch the Sky by the jazz group Fourplay

== Mountains ==
- Mount Elbert, highest summit of the Rocky Mountains, called the "gentle giant"
- Mount Moosilauke, New Hampshire, sometimes referred to as the "Gentle Giant"

== People ==
- Claude Coats (1913–1992), American artist, animator and set designer associated with Disney
- Mal Evans (1935–1976), road manager, assistant and friend of the Beatles
- Manuel Martínez Gutiérrez (born 1974), Spanish retired shot putter
- Geoff Leek (1932–2008), Australian rules footballer
- Stuart S. Murray (1898–1980), US Navy vice admiral
- Günter Schlierkamp (born 1970), German retired professional bodybuilder
- Lee Roy Selmon (1954–2011), American National Football League player
- Lacina Traoré (born 1990), footballer from Ivory Coast
- Robert Wadlow (1918–1940), tallest person in history for whom there is irrefutable evidence
- Don Williams (1939–2017), American singer and songwriter nicknamed the "Gentle Giant" of country music
- Arthur Wint (1920–1992), Jamaican middle-distance runner and first Jamaican Olympic champion

== Other uses ==
- Gentle Giant (film), a 1967 film about a boy and his pet bear
- Gentle Giant Moving Company, a national American moving company
- nickname of the Flemish Giant rabbit, a breed of domestic rabbit

== See also ==
- John Charles (1931–2004), Welsh footballer nicknamed "Il Gigante Buono" ("The Gentle Giant") while playing in Italy
- Contrabass flute and Subcontrabass flute, both sometimes called the "gentle giant" of the flute family
