= Frances Packing House =

- U.S. National Register of Historic Places
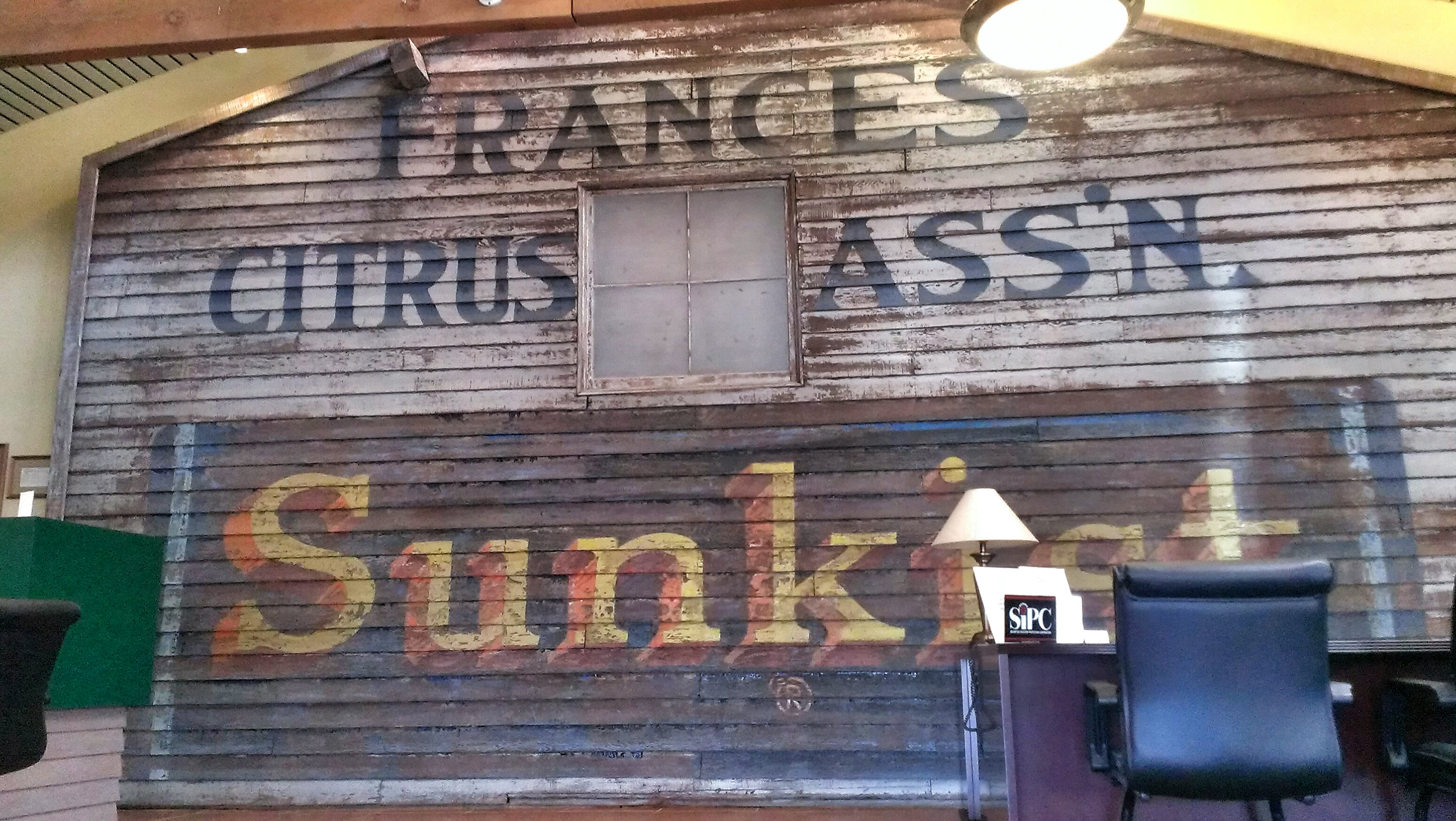
- The preserved wall of the packing house

- Location within California Location within the United States
- Nearest city: Irvine, California
- Coordinates: 33°42′39″N 117°45′48″W
- Area: 1 acre (0.40 ha)
- Built: 1916
- NRHP reference No.: 77000319
- Added to NRHP: August 2, 1977

The Frances Packing House in Orange County, California near Irvine, California was a historic packing house built in 1916. It was listed on the National Register of Historic Places (NRHP) in 1977.

The packing house closed in 1971, and the building was demolished in 1977. One wall of the building was saved and is now part of a bank in the Walnut Shopping Center.

== See also ==
- Elephant Packing House, also NRHP-listed in Orange County
