= Unpacking =

Unpacking may refer to:

- Unpacking (linguistics), the separation of the features of a segment into distinct segments
- Unpacking (video game), a 2021 puzzle game
- Unpacking (computer science), unpacking programming variables

== See also ==
- Pack (disambiguation)
- Packing (disambiguation)
