= Partners in Quality =

Partners in Quality is an Agricultural Marketing Service (AMS) process verification program for fresh produce that is run by the US Department of Agriculture.

Partners in Quality allows fresh produce packing houses that incorporate specified, rigorous quality standards and requirements (monitored by periodic unannounced AMS audits) into their ongoing daily operations, to forgo the traditional, more costly, and less flexible end-of-the-line inspections that AMS conducts before awarding a quality grade to the company's products.
