= Charles Packe =

Charles Packe may refer to:

- Charles Packe (explorer)
- Charles Packe (cricketer)
- Charles Packe (MP)
