= Packers and Stockyards Act =

U.S. federal law

- Other short titles: Packers' Bill; Packers and Stockyards Act, 1921
- Long title: An Act to regulate interstate and foreign commerce in live stock, live-stock products, dairy products, poultry, poultry products, and eggs, and for other purposes.
- Acronyms (colloquial): PSA
- Nicknames: Packers and Stockyards Act of 1921
- Enacted by: the 67th United States Congress
- Effective: August 15, 1921

Citations
- Public law: Pub. L. 67–51
- Statutes at Large: 42 Stat. 159

Legislative history
- Introduced in the House as H.R. 6320 by Gilbert N. Haugen (R–IA) on May 18, 1921; Committee consideration by House Agriculture, Senate Agriculture and Forestry; Passed the House on June 2, 1921 (passed); Passed the Senate on June 17, 1921 (passed); Reported by the joint conference committee on June 24, 1921; agreed to by the Senate on August 4, 1921 (50-11) and by the House on August 9, 1921 (agreed); Signed into law by President Warren G. Harding on August 15, 1921

The Packers and Stockyards Act of 1921 (7 U.S.C. §§ 181-229b; P&S Act) regulates meatpacking, livestock dealers, market agencies, live poultry dealers, and swine contractors to prohibit unfair or deceptive practices, giving undue preferences, apportioning supply, manipulating prices, or creating a monopoly. It was enacted following the release in 1919 of the Report of the Federal Trade Commission on the meatpacking industry.

== History and passage ==
As the outbreak of World War I occurred and the cost of living rose, President Woodrow Wilson ordered the FTC to investigate the industry from the "hoof to the table" to determine whether there were any "manipulations, controls, trusts, combinations, or restraints out of harmony with the law or the public interest."

The FTC reported that packers were manipulating markets, restricting flow of foods, controlling the price of dressed meat, defrauding producers and consumers of food and crushing competition. The FTC, in fact, recommended governmental ownership of the stockyards and their related facilities.

The meat packing industry had also become a prime concern of Wilson's Attorney General Alexander Mitchell Palmer. After threatening an antitrust suit, in February 1920 Palmer managed to force the "Big Five" packers (Armour, Cudahy, Morris, Swift and Wilson) to agree to a consent decree under the Sherman Antitrust Act (1890) which drove the packers out of all non-meat production, including stockyards, warehouses, wholesale and retail meat.

Agitation for legislation to regulate the packers persisted into the Warren Harding administration despite the decree. The United States Congress sought to protect farm profits through the Emergency Tariff of 1921 on May 27. Congress passed the Packers and Stockyards Act on August 15, 1921, as H.R. 6320 and the law went into effect in September 1921. Congress would go on to pass the Future Trading Act the next week and granted farmers' co-ops broad antitrust immunity in the Capper–Volstead Act on February 18, 1922.

The Act's purpose at the time it was passed was to "regulate interstate and foreign commerce in live stock, live-stock produce, dairy products, poultry, poultry products, and eggs, and for other purposes." It prohibited packers from engaging in unfair and deceptive practices, giving undue preferences to persons or localities, apportioning supply among packers in restraint of commerce, manipulating prices, creating a monopoly or conspiring to aid in unlawful acts. The Act also made stockyards quasi-public utilities and required yard officers, agents and employees to register with the government. Stockyards were forbidden from dealing in the livestock they handled, and required them to maintain accurate weights and measures and pay shippers promptly. However, not all stockyards were under the jurisdiction of the Act. Only those with pen space larger than twenty thousand square feet were regulated.

Today, the Act's scope has expanded to regulate the activity of livestock dealers, market agencies, live poultry dealers and swine contractors as well as meatpackers.

== Interpretation ==
=== Court interpretation ===
The Supreme Court of the United States upheld the act in Stafford v. Wallace (1922). Chief Justice William Howard Taft reasoned the act was a valid exercise under the interstate Commerce Clause because it addressed the same problem as the injunction upheld in Swift & Co. v. United States (1905).

In 1996, a group of cattle feeders brought a class action lawsuit under the P&S Act against Iowa Beef Packers for captive supply agreements. In 2004, a jury delivered a verdict for the plaintiffs, finding damages of $1.2 billion. The verdict was then thrown out by the United States Court of Appeals for the Eleventh Circuit in Pickett v. Tyson Fresh Meats Inc. (2005) because it found the meatpacker had a legitimate business reason to limit competition.

In 2008, a federal district court found that Pilgrim's Pride had given undue advantages to Lonnie "Bo" Pilgrim, its founder and chairman. Judge Emilio M. Garza of United States Court of Appeals for the Fifth Circuit affirmed, over a dissent by Judge Thomas Morrow Reavley. The Fifth Circuit en banc then reversed, voting 9-7 in Wheeler v. Pilgrim's Pride Corp. (2009). Judge Reavley wrote that all claims under the P&S Act must prove adverse impact to competition, over a dissent by Judge Garza.

=== Agency interpretation ===
The P&S Act is administered by the Grain Inspection, Packers and Stockyards Administration (GIPSA) of the United States Department of Agriculture. In 2010, GIPSA Administrator J. Dudley Butler and United States Assistant Attorney General for Antitrust Christine A. Varney held a series of hearing on monopsony, market manipulation, and market concentration in agriculture. On June 22, 2010, GIPSA published a proposed rule that would have reduced the legal standard for anti-competitive practices, forbidden unfair practices and undue advantages even without harm to competition, and ensured producers had access to arbitration. In addition, the proposed rule sought to combat price fixing by prohibiting packers from selling to other packers and preventing multiple packers from using a single buyer.

The proposed rule was supported by the National Farmers Union and the U.S. Cattlemen's Association but opposed by the National Cattlemen's Beef Association and the National Chicken Council. USDA estimated the rule would cost between $21.3 million to $72.1 million. The American Meat Institute estimated the rule would cost $14 billion.

On November 3, 2011, GIPSA announced it would publish the final rule, but without the controversial price fixing measures. On November 18, 2011, Congress defunded USDA's implementation of most of the rest of the rule. Assistant AG Varney and Administrator Butler had both resigned by the end of January 2012.

Congress continued defunding the rule in riders to the 2013, 2014, and 2015 appropriation bills. An amendment to permanently repeal the GIPSA rule in the Agricultural Act of 2014 failed after meatpackers' opposition to the rule was lampooned on Last Week Tonight with John Oliver.

== Amendment ==
The Act has been updated several times to keep pace with a changing and dynamic industry.

The first major amendment to the Act was in 1958, when Congress expanded the jurisdiction of the United States Department of Agriculture (USDA) to include all auction markets operating in commerce. Before 1958, only auction markets with an area of 20,000 square feet (1,858 m^{2}) or more were covered. In addition, jurisdiction over market agencies and dealers was expanded to include all of their livestock activities in commerce, including those away from stockyards.

In 1976, the Act was amended to increase financial protection to livestock producers and to expand USDA jurisdiction. This amendment:

1. required meat packers with annual livestock purchases of over $500,000 to be bonded;
2. provided trust protection for producers in the event of nonpayment for livestock by a meat packer;
3. expanded USDA's jurisdiction over wholesale brokers, dealers, and distributors marketing meat in commerce and
4. authorized the Agency to assess civil penalties of not more than $10,000 per violation.

In subsequent legislation that amount was increased to $11,000 for packers, swine contractors, stockyard owners, market agencies, or dealers, and $27,000 for live poultry dealers.

In 1987, the Act was amended to provide trust protection to live poultry sellers and contract growers in the event of nonpayment for poultry by live poultry dealers and in 2000 it was amended to require P&SP to perform an annual assessment of the cattle and hog industries.

The Farm Security and Rural Investment Act of 2002 (2002 Farm Bill) amended the Act to regulate certain activities of swine contractors who enter into swine production contracts with contract growers.

In general, the amendment made swine contractors subject to certain provisions of the Packers and Stockyards Act. The amendment prohibited certain activities of swine contractors, required swine contractors to maintain certain records, and held them responsible for the acts of their employees, officers, and agents. The amendment also gave swine production contract growers the right to sue swine contractors in federal district court. The amendment did not impose any new bonding or registration requirements, establish a trust for swine production contract growers, or establish any prompt payment requirements for swine contractors.

=== Amendments to 1921 Act ===
Chronological amendments and revisions to the Packers and Stockyards Act of 1921.

Date of Enactment	Public Law Number	U.S. Statute Citation	U.S. Legislative Bill	U.S. Presidential Administration
May 5, 1926	Pub. L. 69–180	44 Stat. 397	H.R. 7818	Calvin Coolidge
August 14, 1935	Pub. L. 74–272	49 Stat. 648	S. 12	Franklin D. Roosevelt
August 10, 1939	Pub. L. 76–376	53 Stat. 1351	H.R. 4998	Franklin D. Roosevelt
June 19, 1942	Pub. L. 77–615	56 Stat. 372	H.R. 5204	Franklin D. Roosevelt
September 2, 1958	Pub. L. 85–909	72 Stat. 1749	H.R. 9020	Dwight D. Eisenhower
July 8, 1963	Pub. L. 88–61	77 Stat. 79	H.R. 5860	John F. Kennedy
July 31, 1968	Pub. L. 90–446	82 Stat. 474	H.R. 10673	Lyndon B. Johnson
September 13, 1976	Pub. L. 94–410	90 Stat. 1249	H.R. 8410	Gerald R. Ford
October 2, 1978	Pub. L. 95–409	92 Stat. 886	S. 3272	Jimmy E. Carter
November 23, 1987	Pub. L. 100–173	101 Stat. 917	H.R. 3457	Ronald W. Reagan

== See also ==
- Packers and Stockyards Act, Section 409
- Packer concentration
