= Rath Packing Company =

Meat packing company in Iowa

The Rath Packing Company was a meatpacking company located in Waterloo, Iowa, between 1891 and 1985. Strike action in 1948, resulted in disorder and the death of a striking union member. Financial decline, which continued after employees gained some control of the company in 1980, did not reverse the decline and the company was liquidated in 1985.

== History ==
The Rath Packing Company (Rath) of Waterloo (Iowa) opened for business in 1891, on the Cedar River. Initially, the company concentrated on hogs, but by 1908 the company was also slaughtering beef and soon lamb as well. Business thrived; lucrative contracts to supply meat to the Armed Forces during both World Wars helped the company grow. Growth and profitability were also spurred between the 1930s and 1950s by innovations such as the fancy dry curing of bacon and the vacuum canning of meats. By the company's fiftieth anniversary in 1941, the company was the nation's largest meatpacking facility. By the end of World War II, Rath was the fifth largest meatpacker in the U.S. Through two world wars, stock market panics, depression, and drought, the company had failed to show a profit in only four of its years.

The years following World War II brought labor troubles. A 1948 strike at the Waterloo plant resulted in the death of a striking union member, a woman being injured, and a riot that involved 27 cars being overturned and fences being torn down. Iowa National Guard troops were called in to restore order.

=== Decline ===
The 1960s and 1970s were difficult times for the meat packing industry. Competition was fierce and the industry had become high volume, low margin. Profitability was hurt by a decline in per capita pork consumption beginning in 1960. By the mid 1970s, Rath's 50-year-old four-story plant was designed in a way that led to inefficiencies. The new model for packing houses used single-level premises.

In 1980, the United Food and Commercial Workers Union which represented most of the labor force, negotiated a plan that, in exchange for wage and benefit concessions from the workers, gave them control of Rath's board of directors. The employee-owned Rath operated at a loss in 1981-1983. After a series of further financial setbacks, Rath closed in 1985.

== Notable employees ==
Boxer and future actor Al Hoosman worked at the plant in the late 1930s.

== See also ==
- Rath Packing Company Administration Building
