= Paak =

Paak may refer to:

- Anderson .Paak, American singer and rapper
- Atka Airport (ICAO: PAAK)

== See also ==
- Pak (disambiguation)
