= Chicago Packer =

Weekly newspaper

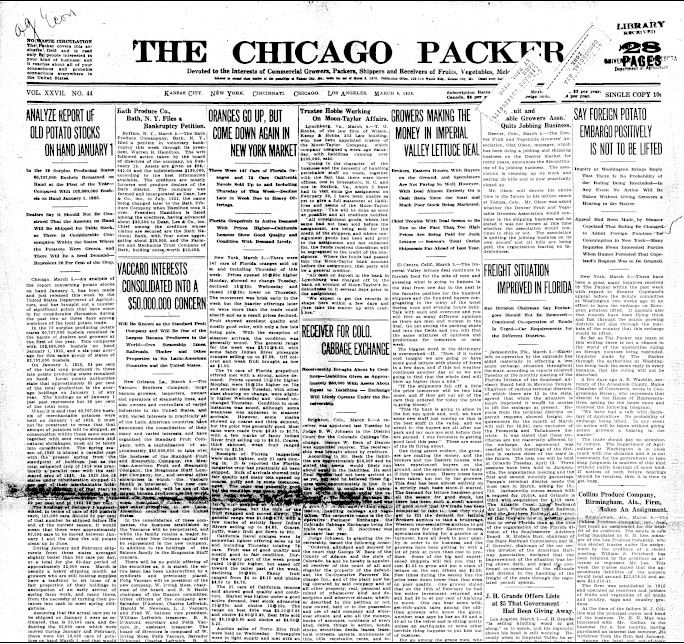
- Type: Weekly newspaper
- Founded: 1899
- Headquarters: Chicago, Illinois

The Chicago Packer (1899–1910) was a weekly newspaper published in the early 20th century which catered to the interests of commercial growers, produce handlers, and poultry farmers. It devoted to fruits, vegetables, butter, eggs and poultry. Specifically published out Chicago, Illinois as an edition of the Kansas City Packer there were other editions published out of New York City, New York, Cincinnati, Ohio, and Los Angeles, California.
