= Seacoast Packing Company =

- U.S. National Register of Historic Places
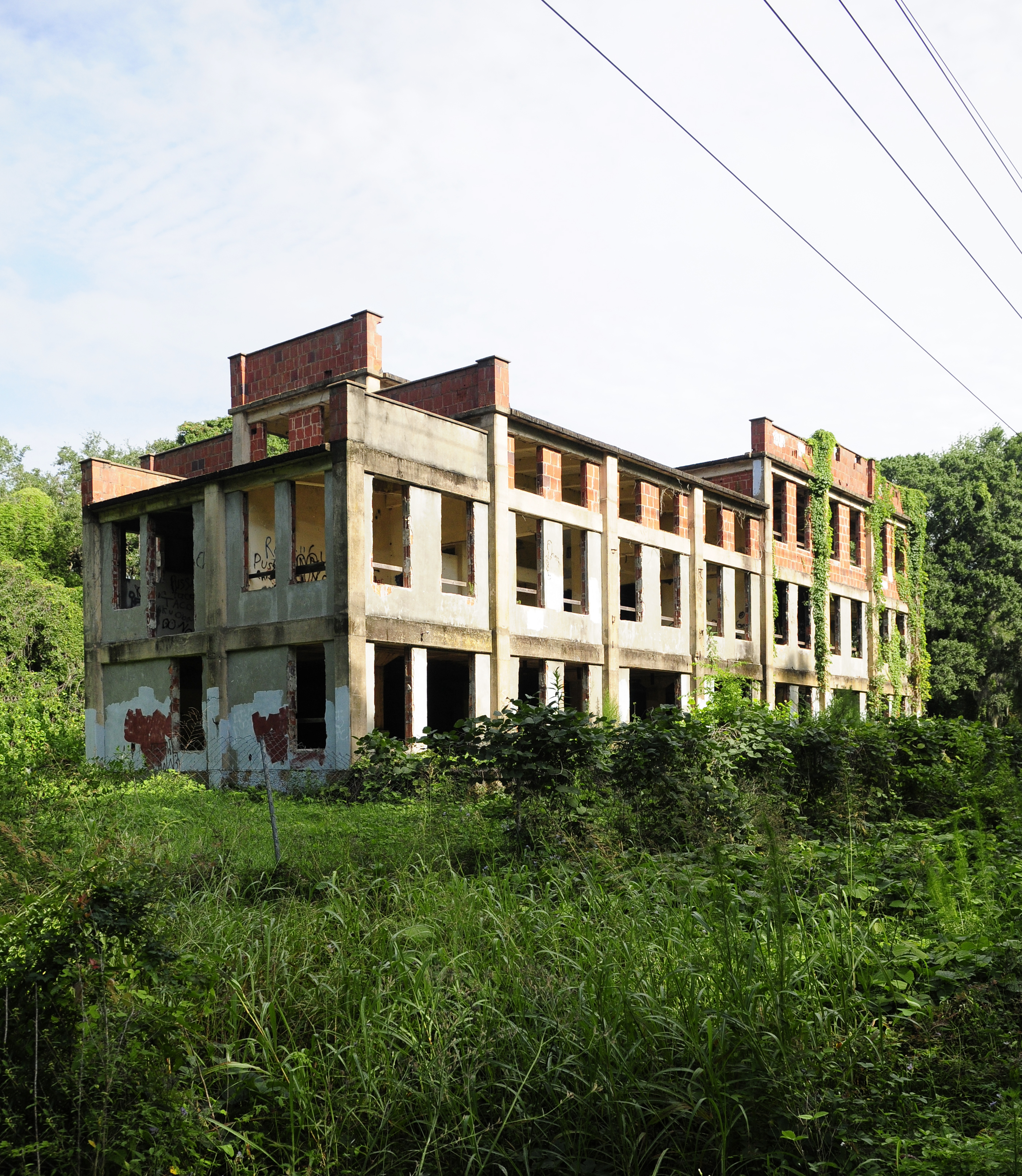

- Location within South Carolina Location within the United States
- Location: 100 Dill Dr., Beaufort, South Carolina
- Coordinates: 32°25′23″N 80°41′35″W
- Area: 1.1 acres (0.45 ha)
- Built: 1920
- Built by: Brooks Engineering
- Architectural style: Industrial
- NRHP reference No.: 08000537
- Added to NRHP: June 17, 2008

The Seacoast Packing Company is a historic packing house in Beaufort, South Carolina that was listed on the National Register of Historic Places in 2008. Also known as Peninsular Canning Company/Pig Factory and as Pickle Factory, it was built by Brooks Engineering. It was listed on the National Register of Historic Places in 2008.
