= J. C. Palumbo Fruit Company Packing and Warehouse Building =

- U.S. National Register of Historic Places
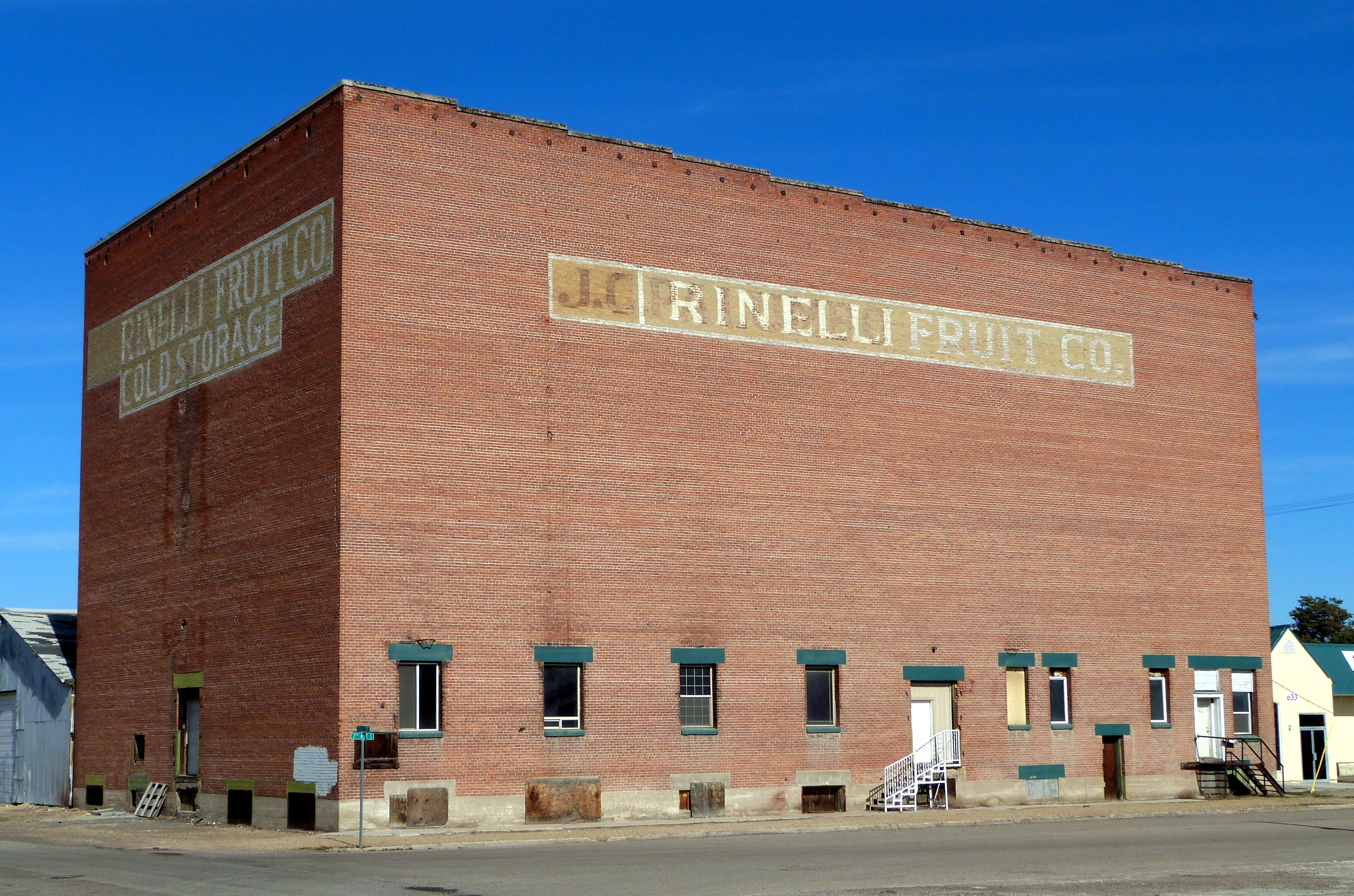
- The Palumbo Fruit Company Packing and Warehouse Building in 2015

- Location within Idaho Location within the United States
- Location: 2nd Ave. S. and 6th St. Payette, Idaho
- Coordinates: 44°04′22″N 116°56′15″W
- Area: less than one acre
- Built: 1928
- Architect: Tourtellotte & Hummel
- MPS: Tourtellotte and Hummel Architecture TR
- NRHP reference No.: 82000360
- Added to NRHP: November 17, 1982

The J.C. Palumbo Fruit Company Packing and Warehouse Building is a historic packing house in Payette, Idaho that was built in 1928. It was designed by architects Tourtellotte & Hummel.

The building was listed on the U.S. National Register of Historic Places in 1982.

It is supposedly a 12 feet (3.7 m) by 74 feet (23 m) structure.

It was deemed significant as one of few non-retail and non-office commercial structures designed by Tourtelotte & Hummel and covered in a 1982 group nomination of properties to the National Register. It was asserted that "its monolithic brick surface may be seen in heralding the end, in the work of this firm, of a habit of dressing up such buildings in the materials one would expect to find in an office block." The building "expresses an interest in beautification by use of a brick veneer which is not, strictly speaking, necessary. At the same time, physical function is clearly expressed, through fenestration or its lack, by loading docks and by the trackside location. While its sleekness may be seen as precursor of a functionalist aesthetic, it seems also to mark the beginning of the end of this sort of expression in this sort of building. Plain cast concrete became the material of choice, and none of the warehouse and shop buildings designed in later years" by the firm has been deemed noteworthy enough for inclusion in the 1982 group nomination.
