= Packers and Stockyards Act, Section 409 =

Section 409 of the Packers and Stockyards Act regulates that meatpackers pay promptly for livestock that they purchase. It requires that any meatpacker or dealer buying livestock to pay up in full to the seller before the end of the next business day. 409(b) states that the purchaser is exempt from this requirement if the parties have other payment agreements in writing.

== History ==
The law was passed in 1921 as part of the Packers and Stockyards Act (7 U.S.C. §§ 181-229b; P&S Act) which was passed in order to "regulate interstate and foreign commerce in live stock, live-stock produce, dairy products, poultry, poultry products, and eggs, and for other purposes."

== Penalty ==
A dealer who violates the law could be assessed a fine not exceeding 32,000 dollars for each violation. When determining the amount of the violation, the secretary should consider the gravity of the offense.

== Enforcement ==
The only time experts remember that a meatpacker was criminally charged for violating the law was in 2010 when Sholom Rubashkin the CEO of agriprocessors was charged with failing to pay 31 cattle suppliers within 24 hours. Rubashkin at times paid as much as 11 days late causing a loss of $3,800.51 of potential interest. Federal Judge Linda R. Reade added 4 years in prison for this violation alone.
