= The Pack =

The Pack may refer to:

== Film and television ==
- The Pack (1977 film), a horror film directed by Robert Clouse
- The Pack, a 2009 film starring Lucie Arnaz
- The Pack (2010 film), a French films, also known as La meute
- The Pack (2015 film), Australian horror film directed by Nick Robertson
- The Pack (2022 film), a Colombian-French drama film
- The Pack (TV series), a 2020 reality television series hosted by Lindsey Vonn
- "The Pack" (Buffy the Vampire Slayer), a season 1 episode of Buffy the Vampire Slayer
- The Pack (Gargoyles), a team of villains on the animated series Gargoyles

== Music ==
- The Pack, later Theatre of Hate, a British punk rock band formed in 1978
- The Pack (group), a rap group from Berkeley, California
- The Pack A.D., a garage rock duo from Vancouver, British Columbia
- The Pack, a 60's UK beat group from Calne, Wiltshire

== Other uses ==
- Pack (aircraft)
- Pack (canine)
- Green Bay Packers, an American football team based in Green Bay, WI
- Wolfpack, North Carolina State University in NCAA Division I athletics
- Toronto Wolfpack, a trans-Atlantic rugby league team based in Canada and the UK
- The Pack (YouTube group), YouTube group

== See also ==
- Pack (disambiguation)
