= Earle R. Taylor House and Peach Packing Shed =

- U.S. National Register of Historic Places
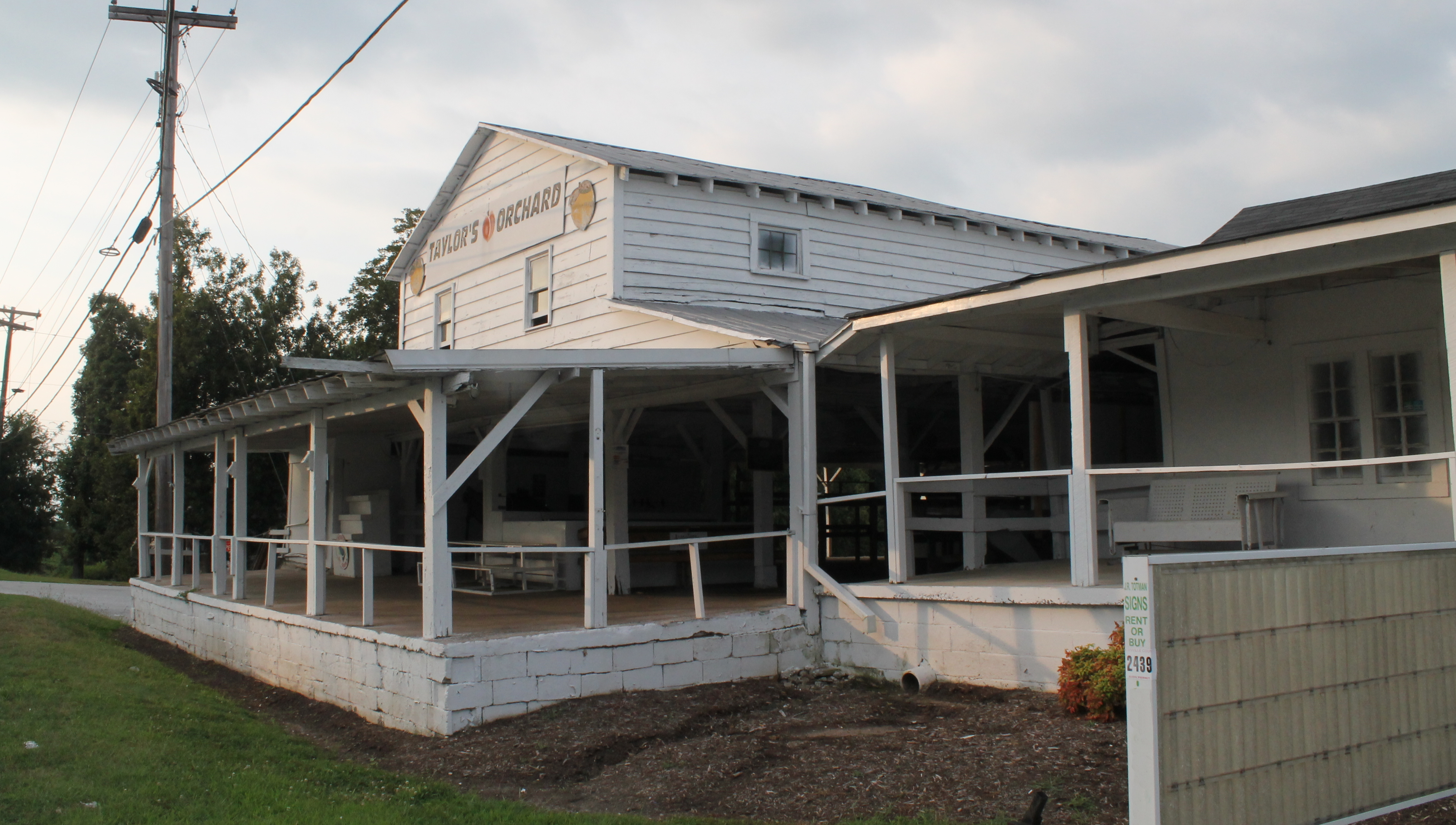

- Location within South Carolina Location within the United States
- Location: 1001 Locust Hill Rd., near Greer, South Carolina
- Coordinates: 34°56′52″N 82°15′46″W
- NRHP reference No.: 12000372
- Added to NRHP: June 27, 2012

The Earle R. Taylor House and Peach Packing Shed, in Greenville County, South Carolina, near Greer, South Carolina. It was listed on the National Register of Historic Places on June 27, 2012.

== See also ==
- List of packing houses
