= Pak =

Pak or PAK may refer to:

== Places ==
- Pakistan (country code PAK)
- Pak, Afghanistan
- Pakpak Bharat, a regency in North Sumatra, Indonesia
- Pak Island, in the Admiralty Islands group of Papua New Guinea
- Pak Tea House, a café in Lahore, Punjab, Pakistan
- Pakistan-administered Kashmir (PAK)

== Arts and entertainment ==
- PAK (band), an American band
- Pak Pak Pakaak, a 2005 Indian Marathi-language film
- Perfect All-Kill, a music chart achievement in South Korea
- Pak, Nintendo's sensational spelling of the word "pack" as a name for their game media and accessories:
  - Controller Pak, the Nintendo 64's memory card
  - Expansion Pak, a RAM add-on for Nintendo 64
  - Game Pak, game cartridges designed for early Nintendo systems
  - Option Pak, any of a number of special attachments for the Nintendo DS
  - Rumble Pak, a haptic feedback device
  - Transfer Pak, a data-transfer device
  - Tremor Pak, a third-party Rumble Pak

== People ==
- Pakpak people, an ethnic group in Indonesia
- Pak (Korean surname), or Park
- Pak (creator), formerly Murat Pak, digital artist, cryptocurrency investor, and programmer
- B. J. Pak (born 1974), Korean-American attorney and politician
- Bo Hi Pak (1930–2019), prominent member of the Unification Church
- Gary Pak (born 1952), Asian Hawaiian writer, editor and professor
- Greg Pak (born 1968), American comic book writer and film director
- Igor Pak (born 1971), Russian professor of mathematics at the University of California
- John Pak (born 1998), American professional golfer
- SuChin Pak (born 1976), South Korean-born American television news correspondent
- Ty Pak (born 1938), Korean-born writer and speaker
- Yangjin Pak, South Korean archaeologist
- Joseph Pak (born 2002), showrunner of Battle for Dream Island Again

== Science, technology and military ==
- PAK (file format), used by computers
- Panzerabwehrkanone (Pak or PaK), German anti-tank guns
- p21 activated kinase, any of a family of enzymes
- 9mm P.A.K., a firearm cartridge for a non-lethal gas pistol noisemaking gun

== Other uses ==
- Pak Airways, a former Pakistan airline
- Pak language (disambiguation)
- Pakpak language, a language spoken in Indonesia and written in the Batak script
- Panhellenic Liberation Movement (ΠΑΚ), a Greek organisation that campaigned against the 1967–1974 military regime
- Kurdistan Freedom Party (Parti Azadi Kurdistan), a Kurdish nationalist militant group
- Privatisation Agency of Kosovo, a government agency
- Toast (food), toasted sliced bread

== See also ==
- Paak (disambiguation)
- Pack (disambiguation)
- Pak Protector, a form of life in the Known Space fictional universe
- Tetra Pak, a food packaging company
