= Providence, New York =

Providence
- Town
- Town of Providence
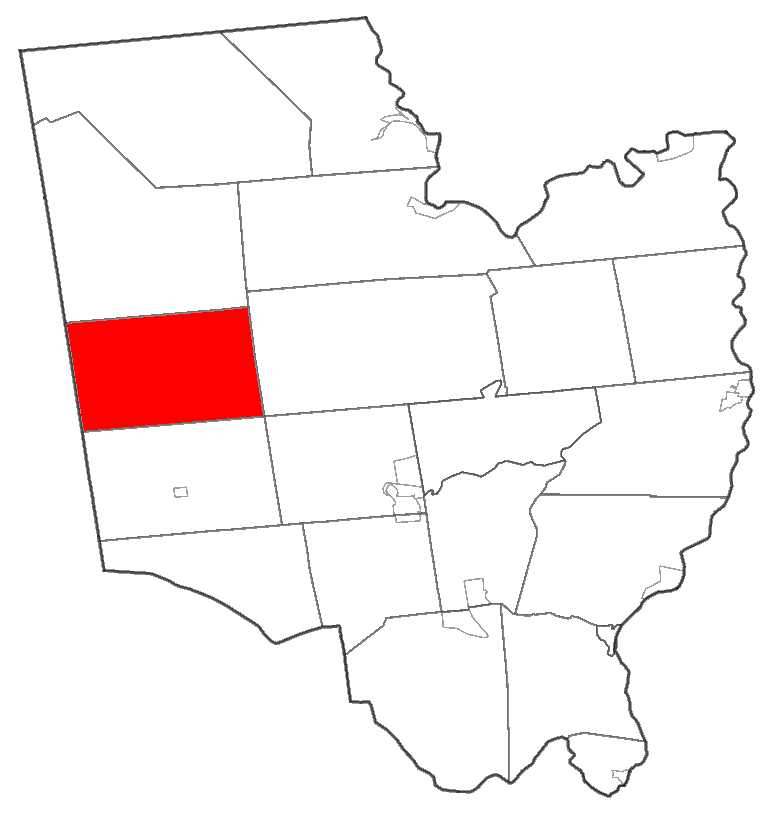
- Map highlighting Providence's location within Saratoga County.

- Location within the state of New York
- Coordinates: 43°6′15″N 74°3′9″W
- Country: United States
- State: New York
- County: Saratoga

Area
  - Total: 45.09 sq mi (116.79 km^{2})
  - Land: 44.00 sq mi (113.95 km^{2})
  - Water: 1.10 sq mi (2.84 km^{2})
- Elevation: 1,457 ft (444 m)

Population (2020)
  - Total: 2,075
  - Density: 47.16/sq mi (18.21/km^{2})
- Time zone: UTC-5 (Eastern (EST))
  - Summer (DST): UTC-4 (EDT)
- ZIP code: 12850
- Area code: 518
- FIPS code: 36-59949
- GNIS feature ID: 0979400

Providence is a town in Saratoga County, New York, United States. The town is on the county's western border, northwest of Saratoga Springs. More than half the town is located within the Adirondack Park, and the town also borders the Great Sacandaga Lake.

== History ==
The area was settled before 1786, but that was the year of any definite settlement, located by Hagedorns Mills.

The town was formed from part of the Town of Galway in 1796. The early economy was based on forestry with the harvesting of lumber, and the manufacture of pulpwood being important.

It is currently under consideration for a municipal wireless broadband network to be built in it.

The Packer Farm and Barkersville Store was listed on the National Register of Historic Places in 2013.

== Geography ==
According to the United States Census Bureau, the town has a total area of 45.1 square miles (117 km^{2}), of which 44.0 square miles (114 km^{2}) is land and 1.1 square miles (2.8 km^{2}) (2.35%) is water.

The western town line is the border of Fulton County, New York. The northern part of the town is in the Adirondack Park, and part of the western town line is the shore of Great Sacandaga Lake.

The town is covered in rolling hills, and has many small streams and lakes. Several reservoirs are located in the northeast of the town.

== Demographics ==
Historical population
Census	Pop.	Note	%±
1820	1,515		—
1830	1,579		4.2%
1840	1,507		−4.6%
1850	1,458		−3.3%
1860	1,443		−1.0%
1870	1,155		−20.0%
1880	994		−13.9%
1890	874		−12.1%
1900	607		−30.5%
1910	520		−14.3%
1920	462		−11.2%
1930	470		1.7%
1940	409		−13.0%
1950	369		−9.8%
1960	556		50.7%
1970	803		44.4%
1980	1,210		50.7%
1990	1,360		12.4%
2000	1,841		35.4%
2010	1,995		8.4%
2020	2,075		4.0%
U.S. Decennial Census

As of the census of 2000, there were 1,841 people, 666 households, and 508 families residing in the town. The population density was 41.8 inhabitants per square mile (16.1/km^{2}). There were 909 housing units at an average density of 20.6 per square mile (8.0/km^{2}). The racial makeup of the town was 97.99% White, 0.71% African American, 0.11% Native American, 0.38% Asian, 0.33% from other races, and 0.49% from two or more races. Hispanic or Latino of any race were 1.30% of the population.

There were 666 households, out of which 36.8% had children under the age of 18 living with them, 65.3% were married couples living together, 6.2% had a female householder with no husband present, and 23.7% were non-families. 16.8% of all households were made up of individuals, and 5.6% had someone living alone who was 65 years of age or older. The average household size was 2.76 and the average family size was 3.12.

In the town, the population was spread out, with 27.3% under the age of 18, 5.5% from 18 to 24, 33.8% from 25 to 44, 24.4% from 45 to 64, and 9.0% who were 65 years of age or older. The median age was 37 years. For every 100 females, there were 102.8 males. For every 100 females age 18 and over, there were 101.7 males.

The median income for a household in the town was $43,194, and the median income for a family was $45,202. Males had a median income of $33,125 versus $22,833 for females. The per capita income for the town was $18,853. About 5.3% of families and 6.4% of the population were below the poverty line, including 9.5% of those under age 18 and 3.0% of those age 65 or over.

== Communities and locations in Providence ==
- Barkersville – A hamlet in the southern part of the town on County Road 16.
- Fayville – A hamlet on the shore of Great Sacandaga Lake on County Road 13 in the northwestern section of town.
- Glenwild – A hamlet in the northern part of the town, north of Barkersville, and inside the Adirondack Park.
- Green Corners – A hamlet in the southeastern part of the town, east of Hagedorns Mills.
- Hagedorns Mills – A hamlet north of Whiteside Corners on County Road 14.
- Lake Desolation – A small lake partly in the town at the eastern town line and County Road 12. Please note the lake is predominantly in Greenfield and can be found there along with the community of the same name.
- Lake Nancy – A small lake north of Wiley Corners.
- Long Corners – A location east of Skinner Corners on County Road 13.
- Shaw Corners – A hamlet in the southern section of the town on County Road 16.
- Skinner Corners – A location in the southeastern part of the town on County Road 13.
- Whiteside Mills – A hamlet in the southwestern part of the town.
- Wiley Corners – A location in the northeastern part of the town on County Road 16.
