= Packing =

Packing may refer to:

== Law and politics ==
- Jury packing, selecting biased jurors for a court case
- Packing and cracking, a method of creating voting districts to give a political party an advantage

== Technical ==
- Close-packing of equal spheres, the arrangement of ions in a crystal
- Packing problems, a family of optimization problems in mathematics

== Other uses ==
- Packing (firestopping), the process of installing backer materials, such as mineral wool in service penetrations
- Packing (phallus), the practice of wearing a phallic object inside the clothing to give the appearance of male genitals
- Packing, in autism therapy, wrapping children in cold wet sheets
- Packing, also known as an O-ring or other type of mechanical seal, a term for a sealing material

== See also ==
- Pack (disambiguation)
- Packer (disambiguation)
- Unpacking (disambiguation)
