= Gentle Giant Moving Company =

American national moving company

Gentle Giant Moving Company, Inc.
- Company type: private
- Industry: Moving and Storage
- Founded: 1980
- Headquarters: Winchester, Massachusetts, United States
- Key people: Larry O'Toole, President
- Website: www.gentlegiant.com

Gentle Giant Moving Company, Inc. is a national moving company which was founded by President Larry O'Toole, originated in Boston, Massachusetts in 1980. It has expanded from a single truck business in Massachusetts to opening offices across the United States. Gentle Giant Moving Company is now located in New Hampshire, Rhode Island, New York, Washington, D.C., North Carolina, Washington state, California, Philadelphia, and its newest office in Fort Lauderdale, Florida.

== Awards ==
Gentle Giant has been recognized by many organizations and awards since its inception including:

- Greater Boston Chamber of Commerce 'Small Business of the Year Award' winner 2002.
- Six-time Improper Bostonian 'Boston's Best' award-winner.
- MetroWest Daily News 'Best Moving Company' award-finalist 2020 and 2021.

Gentle Giant has won several workplace awards including:

- The Wall Street Journal 'Top Small Workplaces Winner' 2007.
- The Boston Globe 'Top Places to Work' award-winner 2008 and 2016.
- Boston Business Journal 'Best Places to Work' award-winner 2006 and 2015.
- Worksite Wellness Council of Massachusetts honoree 2018 and 2021.

== Community Involvement ==
The Gentle Giant Charitable Foundation was founded in 2005. It focuses on two issues: youth leadership development through athletics and education, and homelessness prevention.

Gentle Giant’s partnership with Household Goods provides logistical support to housing assistance programs. As part of the alliance, Giants transport and assemble donated furniture and other household goods to the new homes of those who faced homelessness. Additionally, the company’s work with Move for Hunger has become a core element of its charitable endeavors. In 2021 Gentle Giant was named Move for Hunger’s ‘Mover of the Year’ having transported more than 385,000 pounds of food, the equivalent of 320,000 meals, to the Greater Boston Food Bank.

== Connection to rowing ==
Many of Gentle Giant's employees are athletes, specifically in the sport of rowing. In the 2008 Olympic Games in Beijing, China, two former giants, Dan Walsh and Wyatt Allen, competed in the Men's Eight event, earning a bronze medal in the process. Another former giant, Matt Muffelman, earned a seat in the Lightweight Men's Eight event in the 2008 World Rowing Championships, earning a gold medal. Many other former giants have earned spots on various national teams, including 30 US National Team members, 10 foreign National Team members, and 14 Olympians. In the company's history, it has employed over 400 rowers.
