= Packer concentration =

In United States agricultural regulation, packer concentration is the degree to which a few large firms dominate total sales within segments of the meat-packing industry, which, some farmers and other critics contend, can cause or at least contribute to lower prices for their animals.

Market control by five large packers in the early 1900s led to passage of the Packers and Stockyards Act of 1921 (P.L. 67-51; 7 U.S.C. 181 et seq.). Concentration declined after that, but has increased sharply in more recent years. According to USDA, for example, the four largest firms accounted for 82% of the steer and heifer slaughter in 2000, compared with 36% in 1980. Four-firm concentration in hog slaughter was 56% in 2000, compared with 34% in 1980. Numerous government-sponsored studies and investigations have been inconclusive on the relationship in recent years between concentration and prices.
