= Christopher Packe (physician and cartographer) =

English physician, cartographer and geologist

Christopher Packe (1686–1749) was an English physician and geologist. His 1743 work A New Philosophico-chorographical Chart of East Kent was the first geological map of Southern England.

== Life ==
Packe was born at St. Albans, Hertfordshire, on 6 March 1686. He was probably the son of Christopher Packe the chemist. Packe was admitted to Merchant Taylors' School on 11 September 1695. He was created M.D. at Cambridge in 1717, and was admitted a candidate of the College of Physicians on 25 June 1723. At the request of Robert Romney, the then vicar, he gave an organ to the Church of St Peter, St. Albans, the organ being inaugurated on 16 January 1726.

About 1726 Packe settled at Canterbury. He practiced as a physician, with a good reputation, for nearly a quarter of a century. He died on 15 November 1749, and was buried in St. Mary Magdalene, Canterbury.

== Bibliography ==
Packe had a heated controversy with Dr. John Gray of Canterbury respecting the treatment of Robert Worger of Hinxhill, Kent, who died of concussion of the brain, caused by a fall from his horse. The relatives, not satisfied with Packe's treatment, called in Gray and two surgeons, who, Packe alleged in letters in the "Canterbury News-Letter" of 8 and 15 October 1726, killed the patient by excessive bleeding and trepanning. He further defended himself in A Reply to Dr. Gray's three Answers to a written Paper, entitled Mr. Worger's Case, 4to, Canterbury, 1727.

Packe wrote also:

- A Dissertation upon the Surface of the Earth, as delineated in a specimen of a Philosophico-Chorographical Chart of East Kent, 4to, London, 1737. The essay had been read before the Royal Society on 25 November 1736, and the specimen chart submitted to them.
- ANKOΓΡAΦIA (sic), sive Convallium Descriptio, an explanation of a new philosophico-chorographical chart of East Kent, 4to, Canterbury, 1743. The chart itself, containing a "graphical delineation of the country fifteen or sixteen miles round Canterbury," was published by a guinea subscription in 1743. This is the world's first geomorphological map: to make it Packe measured heights above sea level with a sophisticated barometer, as well as using an adapted theodolite mounted on top of the main tower of Canterbury Cathedral.
- His letters to Sir Hans Sloane, extending from 1737 to 1741, are in the British Museum, Additional (Sloane) MS. 4055.

== Family ==
Packe married Mary Randolph, of the Precincts, Canterbury, on 30 July 1726 at Canterbury Cathedral. Their son Christopher graduated M.B. in 1751 as a member of Peterhouse, Cambridge, practised as a physician at Canterbury, and published An Explanation of ... Boerhaave's Aphorisms . . . of Phthisis Pulmonalis in 1754. He died on 21 October 1800, aged 72, and was buried by the side of his father.
