= Robert Packe =

English cricketer

Robert Julian Packe (8 July 1913 – 24 October 1935) was an English first-class cricketer who played for Leicestershire in 1933. He was born in Hounslow and died in Ahmednagar, India.

He appeared in three first-class matches as a right-handed batsman who bowled slow left-arm orthodox spin. He scored 25 runs with a highest score of 12 and took one wicket with a best performance of one for 31.

Packe's two brothers, Charles and Michael, also played first-class cricket for Leicestershire and both captained the side. Packe was a second lieutenant in the Royal Fusiliers and died after contracting dysentery on service in India.
