= Rath Packing Company Administration Building =

- U.S. National Register of Historic Places
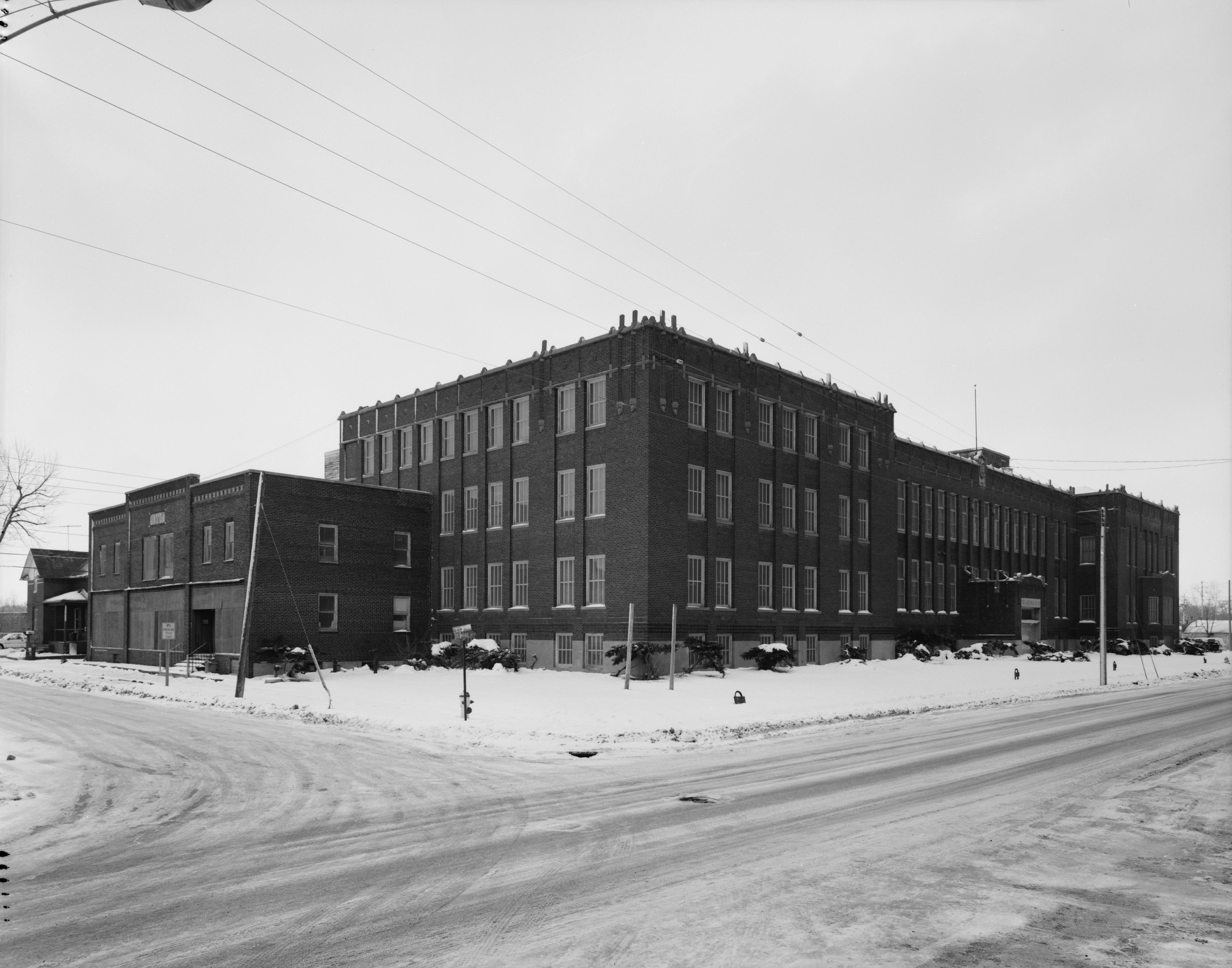

- Location within Iowa Location within the United States
- Location: 1515 East Sycamore Street, 208-212 Elm Street, Waterloo, Iowa
- Coordinates: 42°29′33″N 92°19′24″W
- Area: less than one acre
- Built: 1925
- Built by: John G. Miller Construction Company (original); McDonald, Tom (addition)
- Architect: Bartley, John Solomon Jr.
- Architectural style: Late Gothic Revival
- NRHP reference No.: 08001162
- Added to NRHP: December 10, 2008

The Rath Packing Company Administration Building, also known as Adams Store Inc., is a historic Late Gothic Revival building in Waterloo, Iowa.

It is a surviving remnant of what was the largest meat-packing plant in the United States in 1941. The plant started in 1891 with hogs, and was "massive". The company was the 5th biggest at the end of World War II, in 1945. In 1966 it was the ninth largest, and it was also the 249th biggest industrial company of any kind in the United States. It closed in 1985.

Preservation of the larger complex as a historic district was sought, but was not obtained, as the specialized industrial buildings rapidly deteriorated.

The administration building, completed in 1925, is unlike all other buildings in the plant, in that it was designed by a local architect, who was John S. Hartley (1891/92–1985). It was built by the John G. Miller Construction Company, which had submitted the low bid, $78,496, for the project. An extension was later added by contractor Tom McDonald.

It was listed on the National Register of Historic Places in 2008.

== See also ==
- Rath Packing Company
