= Auburndale Citrus Growers Association Packing House =

- U.S. National Register of Historic Places
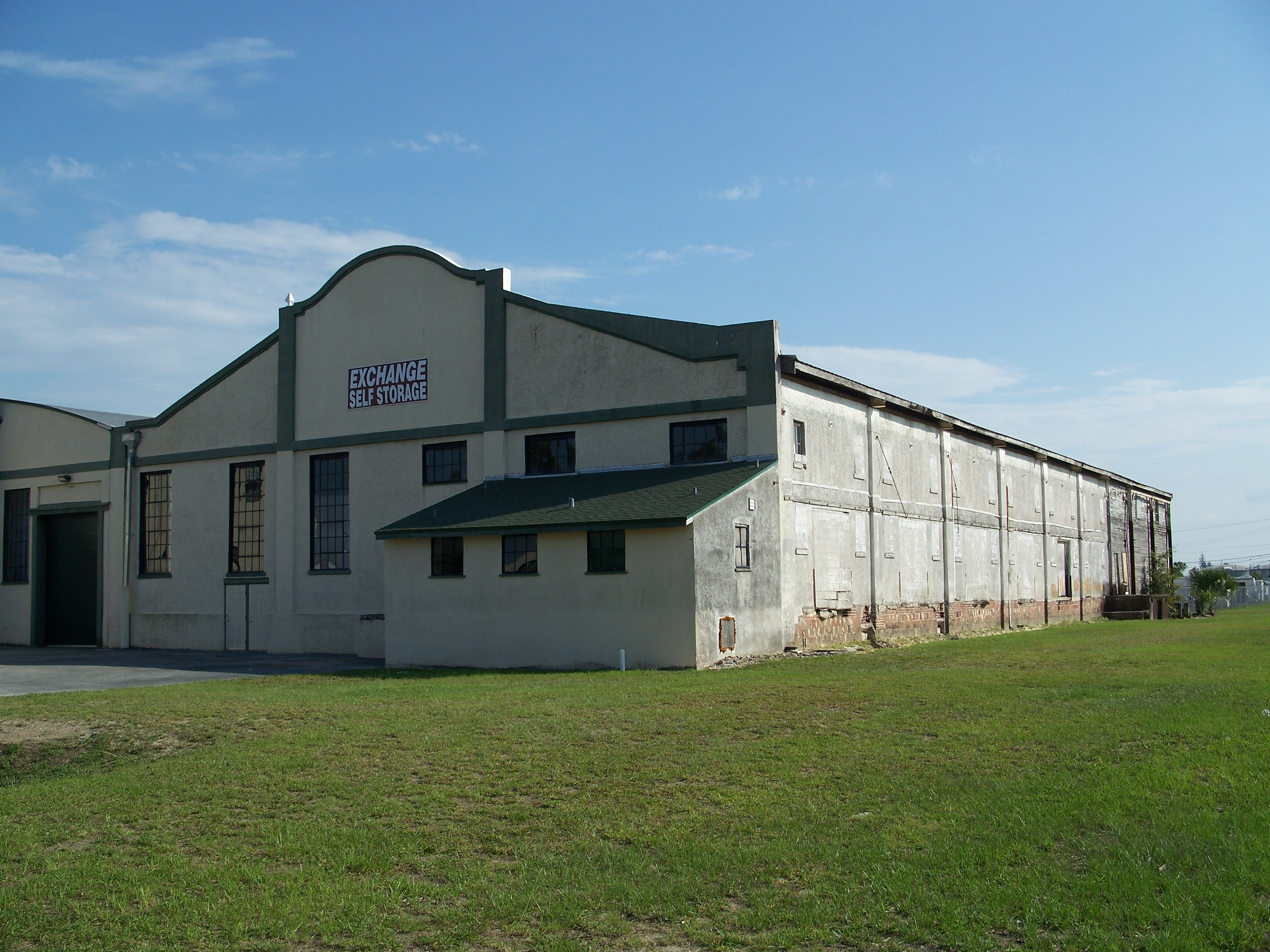

- Location within Florida Location within the United States
- Location: Auburndale, Polk County, Florida
- Coordinates: 28°3′49.6″N 81°47′26.4″W
- Architectural style: Mission/Spanish Revival, Late 19th And 20th Century Revivals
- NRHP reference No.: 97000794
- Added to NRHP: July 17, 1997

The Auburndale Citrus Growers Association Packing House (also known as the Exchange Packing House or Adams Packing Co. Cold Storage Facility) is a historic site in Auburndale, Florida. It is located at 214 Orange Street. On July 17, 1997, it was added to the U.S. National Register of Historic Places.
