= Packer Farm and Barkersville Store =

Historic commercial building in New York, United States

- U.S. National Register of Historic Places
- U.S. Historic district
- Location within New York Location within the United States
- Location: 7189 Barkersville Rd., Middle Grove, New York
- Coordinates: 43°05′22″N 74°02′28″W
- Area: 88.78 acres (35.93 ha)
- Built: c. 1825-1859, c. 1860, c. 1893
- Architectural style: Federal, Greek Revival
- NRHP reference No.: 13000630
- Added to NRHP: August 27, 2013

Packer Farm and Barkersville Store is a historic farm and general store and national historic district located at Middle Grove, Saratoga County, New York. The district encompasses four contributing buildings and one contributing structure in the Town of Providence. They are the Packer house (c. 1825-1859), frame English barn (c. 1825 and later), frame store (c. 1893 and later), second frame barn with attached shed (c. 1860), and a dam. The Packer house is a two-story, frame dwelling moved to its present location about 1857, along with the English barn. The house exhibits Federal and Greek Revival style design elements.

It was listed on the National Register of Historic Places in 2013.
