= E. R. Meres Sponge Packing House =

- U.S. National Register of Historic Places
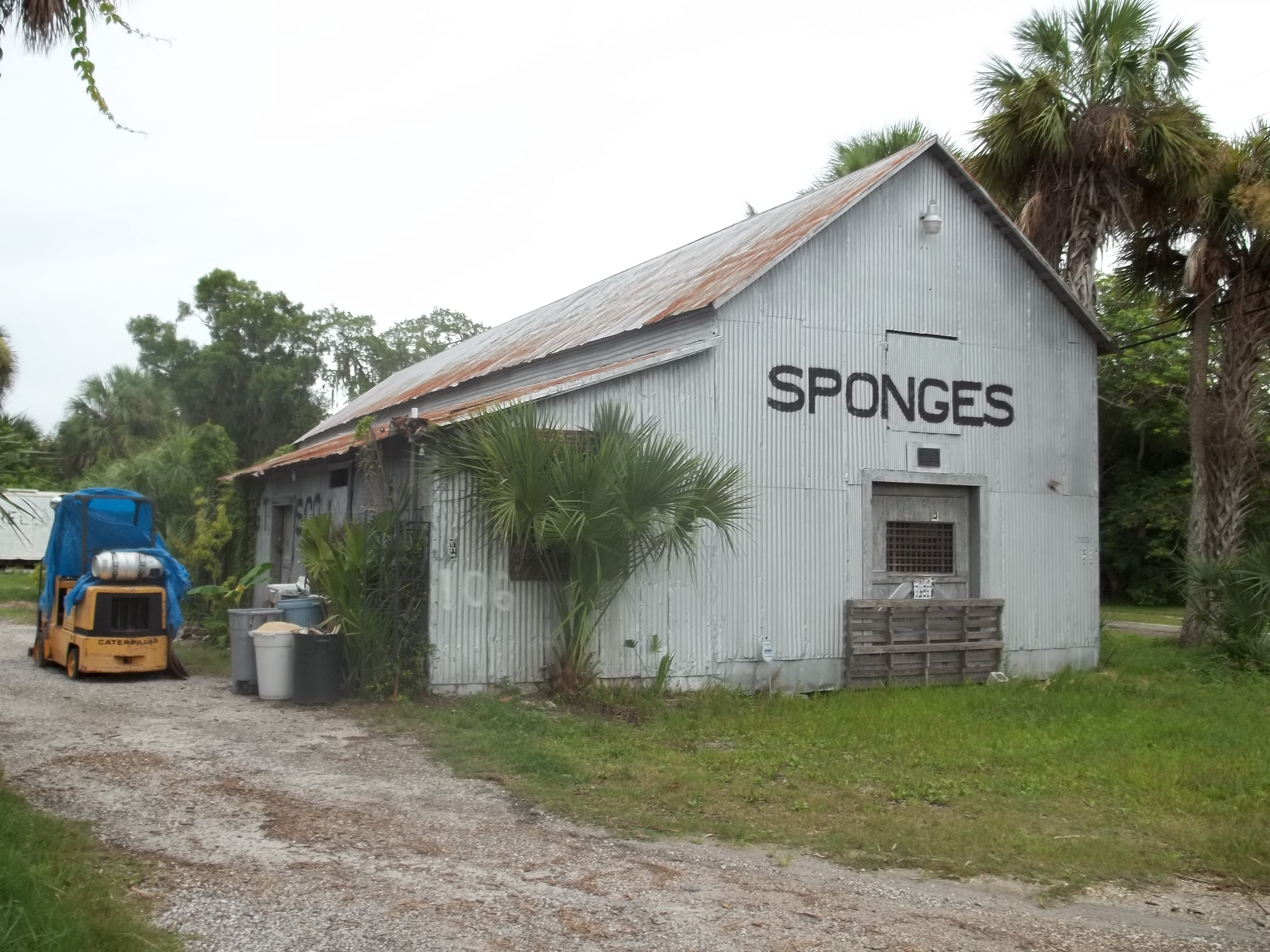

- Location within Florida Location within the United States
- Location: Tarpon Springs, Florida
- Coordinates: 28°8′57″N 82°45′42″W
- NRHP reference No.: 91000411
- Added to NRHP: April 10, 1991

The E. R. Meres Sponge Packing House is a historic site in Tarpon Springs, Florida. It is located at 106 West Park Street. On April 10, 1991, it was added to the U.S. National Register of Historic Places.

== See also ==
- N. G. Arfaras Sponge Packing House
