= Michael Packe =

Personal information
- Full name: Michael St John Packe
- Born: 21 August 1916; Eastbourne, Sussex, England
- Died: 20 December 1978 (aged 62); St Anne, Alderney, Channel Islands
- Batting: Right-handed
- Role: Batsman

Domestic team information
- Years: Team
- 1936–1939: Leicestershire
- 1936–1938: Cambridge University
- First-class debut: 10 June 1936 Cambridge University v Essex
- Last First-class: 30 August 1939 Leicestershire v Derbyshire

Career statistics
Competition	First-class
Matches	41
Runs scored	1151
Batting average	18.86
100s/50s	1/4
Top score	118
Balls bowled	12
Wickets	1
Bowling average	14.00
5 wickets in innings	0
10 wickets in match	0
Best bowling	1/0
Catches/stumpings	30/–
- Source: CricketArchive, 8 June 2008

Michael St John Packe (21 August 1916 – 20 December 1978) was an English historian, biographer, and cricketer. He was the author of The Life of John Stuart Mill (1954), and four other historical works. A right-handed batsman, he played for Leicestershire County Cricket Club between 1936 and 1939, captaining them in 1939. He also played first-class cricket for Cambridge University and represented the Egypt national cricket team.

== Personal life ==
Born in Eastbourne in 1916, Michael Packe was the younger brother of Charles and Robert Packe, both of whom also played cricket for Leicestershire. He was educated at Wellington College and Magdalene College, Cambridge, where he read history. During World War II he served in the Royal Army Service Corps in the First Airborne Division, where he attained the rank of Lieutenant-Colonel. After the Battle of Arnhem in 1944 he was awarded the Dutch Bronze Cross; he was recommended for OBE but not appointed. In 1946 he was demobilised and moved to Alderney, where he grew vegetables commercially, wrote, and was involved in the island cricket team. He was married to Kathryn Packe, a niece of Edith Wharton. He died of a brain tumour on Alderney in 1978.

== Published historical works ==
Packe's first book was First Airborne (1948), reprinted in 1988 as Winged Stallion: Fighting and Training with the First Airborne (ISBN 0713720379). In 1954 he published the work for which he is best known, The Life of John Stuart Mill. The book was generally well received. It was called by Friedrich Hayek "the definitive biography of Mill for which we have so long been waiting." Other reviewers were more cautious. Lionel Robbins of the London School of Economics criticised the Life for neglecting Mill's economic thought, for demoting prominent philosophers such as Jeremy Bentham to the status of comic relief, and for using "a method of presentation which makes it very difficult to distinguish fact from fiction." But Robbins conceded that the book "abounds in new information" and that "it is certainly safe to say that in future no one who wishes to write seriously about Mill can afford to neglect what he [Packe] has done." Later biographers of Mill continued to cite Packe's work; in his 2004 biography of Mill, Nicholas Capaldi called Packe's biography "a gold mine of information," although "the stress is more on the life than on the thought."

Packe's next book, The Bombs of Orsini (1957) was a biography of Felice Orsini, an Italian revolutionary who tried to assassinate Napoleon III. In 1966 he and Maurice Dreyfuss published The Alderney Story, 1939–49, an account of Alderney's wartime occupation and liberation compiled while living witnesses were still available. Packe then began work on a biography of Edward III, but the book was incomplete when he died. This last book was completed by L.C.B. Seaman and published in 1983 as King Edward III (ISBN 0710090242).

== Cricket career ==
Packe made his first-class debut for Cambridge University against Essex in June 1936, playing for the university against the Free Foresters the following week. He first played for Leicestershire in August that year, in a County Championship match against Northamptonshire. He played five more County Championship matches for Leicestershire that month.

He did not play for his university team in the 1937 season, but did play nine first-class matches for Leicestershire – seven in the County Championship, one against Oxford University and one against New Zealand. He played just four matches in 1938, all for Cambridge University, including one against Australia. His last match for the university was against Nottinghamshire.

In April 1939 he played for Egypt against HM Martineau's XI in Cairo. Back in England, he captained Leicestershire during the 1939, playing in 18 County Championship matches in addition to matches against Cambridge University, Oxford University and the West Indies. His last first-class match was against Derbyshire.

On Alderney he served as judge for the local cricket team History of Alderney Cricket, and he left Alderney each year to attend the Lord's Test.

=== Cricket statistics ===
In his 41 first-class matches, Packe scored 1151 runs at an average of 18.86. He made just one century, an innings of 118 for Leicestershire against Glamorgan in 1936, described by Wisden as "brilliant". He took one wicket, that of Yorkshire's Arthur Wood in 1939.
