= Pak language =

Pak may refer to either of these two languages:

- one of the names (better spelled Päk) given to the Lemerig language
- the Pak-Tong language

== See also ==
- Languages of Pakistan
