= The Packer =

Newspaper and website

- Categories: Agricultural
- Frequency: weekly
- First issue: 1893
- Company: Farm Journal Media
- Country: USA
- Language: English
- Website: The Packer

The Packer is a newspaper and website covering the fresh produce industry. Its readers are primarily retail and foodservice buyers of fresh produce. It is published in Lenexa, Kansas.

On a weekly basis in its print publication and throughout the day on its website, The Packer covers fresh fruit and vegetable production and distribution throughout North America. The Packer also covers international fresh produce news relating to imported and exported products. The Packer reports information on topics such as nutrition, legislation and distribution.

The Packer began publication of weekly produce industry news in 1893.

In recent years, The Packer and its website have been finalists for the Jesse H. Neal Award, honoring the best business publications.

Farm Journal Media acquired The Packer and other agriculture publications from Vance Publishing in December 2015.

== See also ==
- List of websites about food and drink
