= Christopher Packe (painter) =

English painter

Faithful Christopher Packe or Pack (1760–1840) was an English painter.

== Life ==
Packe, born in Norwich in 1760, was son of a quaker merchant belonging to a family which claimed connection with that of Sir Christopher Packe, lord mayor of London.

Packe showed an early taste for painting, but at first was engaged in his father's business. On that, however, being seriously injured by pecuniary losses, Pack adopted painting as a profession, and came to London. He made friends with John Hamilton Mortimer, and also obtained an introduction to Sir Joshua Reynolds, making some good copies of the latter's portraits.

In 1786 Packe exhibited a portrait of himself at the Royal Academy, and in 1787 two more portraits. He then returned to Norwich to practice as a portrait-painter, and shortly after went to Liverpool. Having a recommendation from Reynolds to the Duke of Rutland, then viceroy in Dublin, he resided there for some years, and obtained success as a portrait-painter. About 1796 he returned to London, and exhibited at the Royal Academy two portraits, together with "Gougebarra, the Source of the River Lee, Ireland," and "Edward the First, when Prince of Wales, escaping from Salisbury, is rescued by Mortimer."

Pack returned to Dublin in 1802 where he flourished and he continued exhibit and teach. In 1812 he was president of the Society of Arts in 1812 and was vice-president of the Royal Hibernian Society in 1814. By 1820 his fortunes were waning and in 1822 left Dublin and returned to London.

Pack contributed works in oil and watercolours to the British Institution for 1825 until 1839 and had some works displayed at the Royal Academy in 1822 and 1840. In exhibition catalogues his name appears as "C. Pack", "F. C. Pack" or "F. Christopher Pack". He also made landscapes in pastels, and reproduced some of his earlier Irish views in aquatint (the proofs of which were signed "F. Chris Pack"). He died in London on 25 October 1840, (his wife preceded him by a couple of months).
