= Charles Packe (cricketer) =

English cricketer and British Army officer (1909–1944)

Personal information
- Full name: Charles William Christopher Packe
- Born: 2 May 1909; Pietermaritzburg, South Africa
- Died: 1 July 1944 (aged 35) near Caen, German-occupied France
- Batting: Right-handed
- Bowling: Right-arm medium pace
- Role: Batsman
- Relatives: Brothers, Michael and Robert

Domestic team information
- Years: Team
- 1929–34: Leicestershire
- First-class debut: 24 August 1929 Leicestershire v Essex
- Last First-class: 9 June 1939 The Army v Cambridge University

Career statistics
Competition	First-class
Matches	26
Runs scored	1013
Batting average	24.70
100s/50s	2/5
Top score	176
Balls bowled	144
Wickets	3
Bowling average	25.00
5 wickets in innings	–
10 wickets in match	–
Best bowling	2/33
Catches/stumpings	17/–
- Source: CricketArchive, 4 October 2013

Charles William Christopher Packe (2 May 1909 – 1 July 1944) was an English cricketer who played first-class cricket for Leicestershire between 1929 and 1934 and captained the team for much of the 1932 season. He was born at Pietermaritzburg, South Africa and died near Caen, France, during the Second World War. He was a career army officer and also played cricket for the British Army cricket team.

== Cricket career ==
Packe was a right-handed middle-order batsman. Though born in South Africa, his family was settled at Great Glen Hall in Leicestershire and he played for Leicestershire's second eleven in the Minor Counties Championship from 1927. He made his first-class cricket debut in a single match for the county towards the end of the 1929 season, but then did not play again for the next two seasons.

In 1932, Leicestershire struggled to find an amateur to captain the team; the 1931 captain, Eddie Dawson was not available and played only once, and the captain from 1921, Aubrey Sharp, was approached but also was able to play only once. Although no formal appointment was made, Packe, home from the army for the first two-thirds of the season, played in 15 matches as captain, one of six amateurs to captain the team at some stage during the season. Even then, Packe's commitment to Leicestershire was not total: the team's most abject defeat of the season came in the match against Nottinghamshire at Trent Bridge when the side was dismissed twice in 160 minutes of batting time by Harold Larwood and Bill Voce, bowling unchanged. Packe missed the debacle because he was playing for the Army cricket team against a touring South American side. Packe's own record as a batsman was modest, with 451 runs in county matches at an average of 18.79, and three scores of more than 50. He left regular cricket before the end of the 1932 season, but reappeared in five games for Leicestershire in 1934.

There was a brief codicil to Packe's first-class cricket career. Following his appearance for the Army cricket team in 1932, he played four further first-class games for the Army between 1937 and 1939. In a rain-spoiled match against a weak Cambridge University side in May 1938, he hit 176 in 135 minutes, with 29 fours, to record his highest first-class score. His century came in 75 minutes and was the fastest of the season until beaten by Don Bradman, by two minutes, three weeks later. The following season, 1939, the same fixture saw a glut of runs and Packe was again the highest scorer, his 145 on that occasion taking 170 minutes with 20 fours. It was Packe's last first-class match.

== Military career and death ==
Less than a week after Packe's first-class cricket debut, he was cited in the London Gazette as having passed through the Royal Military College as a gentleman cadet and was now attached as a second lieutenant to the Royal Fusiliers. He remained with the regiment for the remainder of his life. In 1937 he is recorded as a lieutenant, seconded to Northern Command as supervising officer for physical training. As Major Packe, he was killed in the action that followed the Normandy landings in the summer of 1944. His wife, the former Margaret Lane Fox, youngest daughter of Lord Bingley, gave birth to their daughter two weeks after his death.
