= The Nobility =

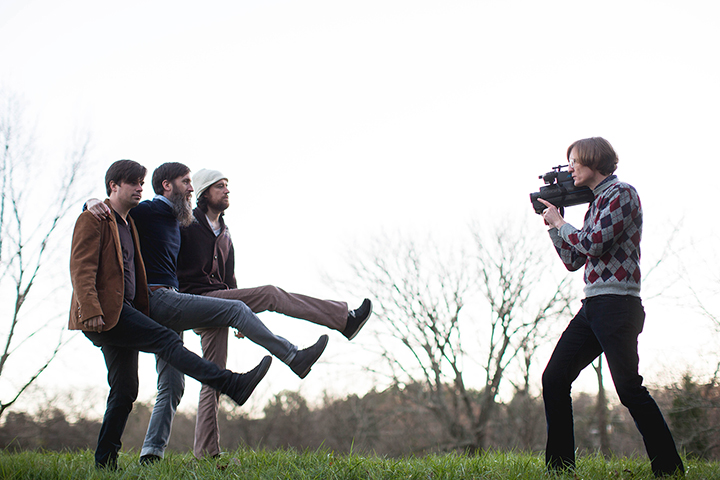

Background information
- Genres: Rock and Roll
- Years active: 2001–present
- Label: Independent
- Members: Sean Williams; Stephen Jerkins; Cheyenne Medders; Will Medders
- Past members: John Grimsley; Pete "The Beat" Traisci; Landon Ihde; Jeremy Lutito; David Dewese; Brian "Barry" Fuzzell; Benjamin A. Harper; Eric Stroud
- Website: thenobility.com

The Nobility is a rock and roll band based in Nashville, Tennessee, currently composed of Sean Williams (lead vocals, rhythm guitar), Stephen Jerkins (background vocals, keys), Cheyenne Medders (background vocals, bass) and Will Medders (background vocals, drums). At certain performances they are joined by a third Medders brother, Carson on lead guitar.

== The Early Years (Jetpack) ==
In the spring of 2001, The Nobility (then known as Jetpack) began playing a slew of shows around the southeast and that summer recorded their first EP, High School Girls. A self-titled album (Jetpack, 2002) and a digital EP (Saxophone, 2003) followed. In the summer of 2004, the band received attention from some major labels, but was never signed. Their final recording under the name "Jetpack," an EP entitled The Art of Building A Moat, was released in early 2005 marking a distinct shift in their sound and lyrical content.

== 2005-2008 ==
=== New lineup ===
After the departure of drummer Jeremy Lutito and bassist Landon Ihde in the spring of 2005, Jetpack was offered an opportunity to shoot a video for a song on The Art of Building A Moat entitled "Mathematics." Down two members, they asked close friends Brian Fuzzell and David Dewese to play the parts of drummer and bassist in the video. Deciding that the chemistry was right both Dewese and Fuzzell stayed on as permanent members in their respective roles following the shoot.

=== Legal roadblocks/Children's book ===
In early 2006, Heatstroke Records, a label located in Philadelphia, Pennsylvania, was set to release The Art of Building A Moat nationwide. Just before the release, Jetpack received a cease and desist notice from a California-based surf rock band also known as Jetpack. Around the same time, a publishing company out of Minneapolis contacted the band asking them to be the subject of a children's book which chronicled the ins and outs of performing in a rock band. Hoping to avoid any legal troubles that would impede the national release of the EP or the children's book, Jetpack came up with a stopgap measure and added a "UK" to the end of their name—a tongue-in-cheek reference to the British band The Charlatans who had added a "UK" to their name for similar reasons. With legal trouble out of the way for the moment, Jetpack UK launched an extensive tour of the Eastern and Midwestern United States in the summer of 2006 to support The Art of Building A Moat. That fall, to take advantage of the fact that they were featured in a children's book (an unusual situation for a rock band), Jetpack UK booked a six-week tour where they played their full-volume set in a host of public libraries and school auditoriums throughout the U.S. With library shows during the day and regular club gigs at night, the band earned enough money to go back into the studio to record their next LP.

=== The Mezzanine ===
In the summer of 2005, songwriter Sean Williams spent several weeks in Little Rock, Arkansas, working on a handful of songs that would eventually make up most of the band's next full-length album, The Mezzanine. While touring as Jetpack UK in the summer of 2006, the band went through an extensive list of possible permanent band names until keyboardist Stephen Jerkins suggested "The Nobility" based on a lyric in one of Williams' new songs ("Halleluiah Chorus"). The band continued to perform under Jetpack UK until the official release of The Mezzanine.

In the fall of 2006, the band headed into the studio in between stints on the road to begin recording The Mezzanine. During the first week-long session the basic tracks were recorded for the following songs:

1. Halleluiah Chorus
2. Riverboat
3. Worth Your While
4. Let Me Hang Around
5. Midst of the Park

After returning from another leg of the library tour, The Nobility recorded these remaining songs:

1. Skeleton Key
2. The Mezzanine
3. This Is What I've Wanted To Tell You
4. Angel's Debut
5. Gold Blue Sky
6. I Refuse

Jim Hoke, famed saxophonist who had worked The Beach Boys, Kenny Rogers, Harry Connick, Jr., My Morning Jacket and Guster, was brought in to play on the song The Mezzanine.

The Mezzanine was released on July 31, 2007. NPR described the album as "jangly guitar rock with sweet harmonies and carefully plotted melodies." A tour in support of the album followed, which included stops at the CMJ Music Festival in New York and SXSW in Austin. Shortly after the initial tour for The Mezzanine, bassist David Dewese left the band to focus on his own musical projects, including the Foxymorons. The Nobility continued playing shows in support of The Mezzanine throughout the remainder of 2007 and 2008 using a host of friends on bass, which included Benjamin A. Harper, Keith Lowen and Cheyenne Medders.

== 2008-2010 ==
=== Gentle Giant ===
By the end of 2008, The Nobility had played several shows in support of The Mezzanine and were now shifting their focus to record more material. That fall, they went back into the studio with Brian Carter to lay down a song that had been in contention for The Mezzanine track list called "Gentle Giant" and another song that had been floating around, but never officially released called "Mr. Danby/Mr. Blackman". The two songs were recorded over a weekend and released in the spring of 2009 as a digital single. A demo Sean Williams had done on 4-track called "The Birds & The Bees" was added. The three-song single was released digitally in spring of 2009. While Benjamin A. Harper plays bass on the two main songs, Cheyenne Medders is seen playing bass in the "Gentle Giant" video and David Dewese is seen playing bass in the "Mr. Danby/Mr. Blackman" video.

=== I've Got a Present for You-The Christmas EP ===
Throughout the years, Sean Williams had randomly written a handful of Christmas tunes so in October 2009, The Nobility decided to officially record them and release them as an EP. David Dewese stepped back in on bass and the songs were tracked at a Nashville studio where Cheyenne Medders worked as an engineer. The following songs were recorded over a five-day period:

- I've Got a Present for You
- Santa Shaved His Beard
- Say the Words, "Merry Christmas"

A fourth song was recorded—a cover of "Good King Wenceslas," which was recorded on Sean Williams' TASCAM four track. The EP, entitled I've Got a Present for You was released electronically that Christmas.

The Christmas EP recording session would mark drummer Brian Fuzzell's last with the band. In early 2010, Fuzzell left the band to pursue other interests.

The very next fall, Williams had written another new Christmas song—"It Must Be Christmastime." The Nobility went back into the studio to record the track, this time with Cheyenne Medders on bass. Williams, Jerkins, Medders along with the band's new drummer, Eric Stroud tracked the song over a couple of days. It was then added to the existing I've Got A Present For You track list along with another four-track composition entitled "Figgy Pudding." The new 2010 version of the EP, which included a physical pressing, was rereleased the day after Thanksgiving.

== 2011-present ==
=== The Secret of Blennerhassett Island ===
In the fall of 2010, The Nobility went back into the studio with Brian Carter to record a collection of songs based on Sean Williams' childhood experiences. The resulting album—The Secret of Blennerhassett Island was recorded over several weeks and utilized a handful of extra musicians including noted cellist, Cara Fox (The Dead Weather, Ingrid Michelson).

Track list:

1. Devil's Lullaby
2. Caviar Comedian
3. Everybody Says It's Funny
4. Marigolds
5. Moonlight Shines
6. Severe Miscalculation
7. My Best
8. Start It All Over
9. The Words
10. Best Day of My Life
11. The Art Form

The Secret of Blennerhassett Island was released in 2011.

=== Ashford Castle ===
In October 2014, The Nobility launched a successful Kickstarter campaign, which allowed them to record their next full-length album, Ashford Castle. Wanting to mix it up, while at the same time maintain their analog sound, the band spent several days at Reel Recording Studios with engineers Mark Gallup and Erik Thompson tracking 10 songs. The track list is as follows:

1. Ashford Castle
2. Wonderful Night
3. Heart Is Strange
4. Rollin' In The Aisle
5. On The Sly
6. I Can't Tell You Why
7. Alone
8. Mrs. Judy May
9. Sharks
10. Walk Into The Light

Ashford Castle was released independently on February 19, 2016.

In April 2016, the album was featured on NPR's All Songs Considered podcast, which noted the band's use of harmonies and musical detail.

As tracking was wrapping up on Ashford Castle, the band booked another day at Reel Recording to track a song featuring The Secret Sisters. This song is yet to be released.

== In pop culture ==
In 2009, "Riverboat" by The Nobility was featured in the Magnolia Pictures release Serious Moonlight starring Meg Ryan and Timothy Hutton.

The grocery store chain Meijer featured the Nobility song "Alone" in a television spot in the spring of 2016.

== Discography ==
=== Studio albums ===
2001 (as Jetpack) High School Girls (WorldCat entry for their early album)

Year	Album Details
2016	Ashford Castle: Released: February 19, 2016; Self-released
2011	The Secret of Blennerhassett Island: Released: October 11, 2011; Self-released
2007	The Mezzanine: Released: July 31, 2007; Label: Theory 8 Records
2006	The Art of Building a Moat reissued under The Nobility: Released: 2005; Label: Theory 8 Records

=== EPs ===
Year	Album Details
2009	I've Got a Present For You: Released: December 7, 2007; Label: Theory 8 Records
2009	Gentle Giant digital single: Released: August 14, 2009; Label: Theory 8 Records
