= Elephant Packing House =

- U.S. National Register of Historic Places
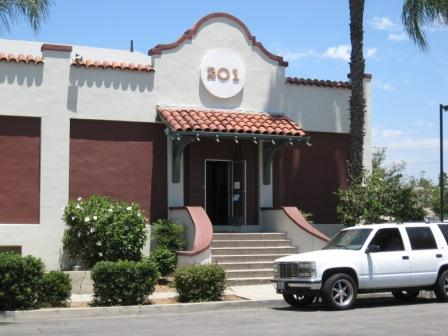
- Mission Revival Style entrance facade.

- Location within California Location within the United States
- Location: 201 W. Truslow Ave., Fullerton, California
- Coordinates: 33°52′3″N 117°55′32″W
- Built: 1924
- Architectural style: Mission Revival— Spanish Colonial revival
- NRHP reference No.: 83001214
- Added to NRHP: September 21, 1983

The Elephant Packing House was built in 1924, in Fullerton, Orange County, Southern California. Valencia oranges were packed here, from the abundant orchards that then dominated the county. William Wolfskill had developed and extensively planted the Valencia orange here in the 19th century. It is one of the last remaining examples of a citrus packing house in Fullerton.

== History ==
The packing house was built in 1924 by the Union Pacific Railway to complement its neighboring train station. The 23,000-square-foot (2,100 m^{2}) packing house first shipped oranges under the Elephant label, and was later leased by grower C.C. Chapman to pack his Old Mission brand oranges.

After it fell out of use for orange shipping, the warehouse was used by a lawn furniture distributor. In 1960 the Union Pacific Railway sold the structure, which has been used by a variety of tenants. It was expanded in 1971. The railway station has since been relocated.

== Description ==
The packing house design is predominantly in the Mission Revival Style, with Spanish Colonial Revival Style architectural elements. The main building measures 165 feet (50 m) by 70 feet (21 m), with one story above grade and a full basement. The interior is lighted by two sawtooth roof monitors. The north side faces onto railroad tracks that run immediately adjacent to the packing house.

== Railroad shipping ==
The Elephant Packing House was located on the Union Pacific Railroad line for shipping to the East Coast and elsewhere. The line is no longer in service.

A Mission Revival style Union Pacific Railroad railway station (built 1923) was already adjacent. It has been preserved and been moved to the Fullerton Transportation Center, next to the Atchison, Topeka and Santa Fe Railway station there (built 1930).

All three buildings are listed on the National Register of Historic Places.

== See also ==
- National Register of Historic Places listings in Orange County, California — listed with images and article links.
- Index: History of Orange County, California
