= Christopher Packe (chemist) =

English chemist

Christopher Packe (born in or before 1657, died in or after 1708), was an English chemist.

Packe set up his laboratory in 1670 at the sign of the "Globe and Chemical Furnaces" in Little Moorfields, London, and styled himself a professor of chemical medicine. He practised as a quack under powerful patronage, including that of the Hon. Robert Boyle and Edmund Dickinson, physician to the king, and in 1684 he circulated a list of his specifics.

== Bibliography ==
In 1689 Packe brought out in goodly folio a translation of the "Works of the highly experienced and famous chymist, John Rudolph Glauber", accompanied by the original copper plates, which he had purchased at Amsterdam. This undertaking occupied him three years, and he secured a large number of subscribers.

Packe other publications were chiefly designed to promote the sale of his specifics, and are as follows:

- De Succo Pancreatico; or a Physical and Anatomical Treatise of the Nature and Office of the Pancreatick Juice, 12mo, London, 1674; a translation from the Latin of R. de Graaf.
- Robert Couch's Praxis Catholica; or the Countryman's Universal Remedy, with additions by himself, duodecimo, London, 1680.
- One hundred and fifty three Chymical Aphorisms, 12mo, London, 1688, from the Latin of Eremita Suburbanus, with additions from that of Bernardus G. Penotus.
- Mineralogia; or an Account of the Preparation, manifold Vertues, and Uses of a Mineral Salt, both in Physick and Chyrurgery ... to which is added a short Discourse of the Nature and Uses of the Sulphurs of Minerals and Metals in curing Diseases, octavo, London, 1693.
- Medela Chymica; or an Account of the Vertues and Uses of a Select Number of Chymical Medicines ... as also an Essay upon the Acetum Acerrimum Philosophorum, or Vinegar of Antimony, 8vo, London, 1708; at the end of which is a catalogue of his medicines, with their prices.

A son, Edmund Packe (fl. 1735), calling himself "M.D. and chemist", carried on the business at the Golden Head in Southampton Street, Covent Garden. He published an edition of his father's Mineralogia (undated) and An Answer to Dr. Turner's Letter to Dr. Jurin on the subject of Mr. Ward's Drop and Pill, wherein his Ignorance of Chymical Pharmacy is fairly exposed, octavo, London, 1735.
