= Pack =

Pack or packs may refer to:

== Music ==
- Packs (band), a Canadian indie rock band
- Packs (album), by Your Old Droog
- Packs, a Berner album

== Places ==
- Pack, Styria, defunct Austrian municipality
- Pack, Missouri, United States (US)
- Chefornak Airport, Alaska, US (by ICAO code)

== Groups of animals or people ==
- Pack (canine), the family structure of African wild dogs, jackals and wolves
  - Pack hunter, any animal that predates cooperatively
- Cub scouts group, in scouting
- Peloton, in road bicycle racing

== Containment, packaging, and shipping ==
- Pack, a deck of playing cards
- Backpack
- Cigarette pack
- Pack animal or beast of burden, an individual or type of working animal used by humans as means of transporting materials

== Other uses ==
- Arctic ice pack
- Pack (aircraft), P.A.C.K (Pneumatic Air Cycle Kit), a kit containing an air cycle machine that provides air conditioning as part of an aircraft's environmental control system
- Pack (compression), a UNIX utility to compress files using Huffman encoding
- Pack (surname)

== See also ==
- Packer (disambiguation)
- Packing (disambiguation)
- Pak (disambiguation)
- Pax (disambiguation)
- The Pack (disambiguation)
- The pack:
  - The scrum formed by forwards in rugby league
  - The scrum formed by forwards in rugby union
