= National Register of Historic Places listings in Pinellas County, Florida =

Location of Pinellas County in Florida

This is a list of the National Register of Historic Places listings in Pinellas County, Florida.

This is intended to be a complete list of the properties and districts on the National Register of Historic Places in Pinellas County, Florida, United States. The locations of National Register properties and districts for which the latitude and longitude coordinates are included below, may be seen in a map.

There are 76 properties and districts listed on the National Register in the county, including 1 National Historic Landmark. Another 3 properties were once listed but have been removed.

This National Park Service list is complete through NPS recent listings posted July 10, 2026.

Contents: Counties in Florida (non-linked contain no National Register listings)
Alachua - Baker - Bay - Bradford - Brevard - Broward - Calhoun - Charlotte - Citrus - Clay - Collier - Columbia - DeSoto - Dixie - Duval - Escambia - Flagler - Franklin - Gadsden - Gilchrist - Glades - Gulf - Hamilton - Hardee - Hendry - Hernando - Highlands - Hillsborough (Tampa) - Holmes - Indian River - Jackson - Jefferson - Lafayette - Lake - Lee - Leon - Levy - Liberty - Madison - Manatee - Marion - Martin - Miami-Dade (Miami) - Monroe - Nassau - Okaloosa - Okeechobee - Orange - Osceola - Palm Beach - Pasco - Pinellas - Polk - Putnam - St. Johns - St. Lucie - Santa Rosa - Sarasota - Seminole - Sumter - Suwannee - Taylor - Union - Volusia - Wakulla - Walton - Washington

== Current listings ==
	Name on the Register	Image	Date listed	Location	City or town	Description
1	Alexander Hotel	Alexander Hotel	November 1, 1984 (#84000200)	535 Central Avenue; 27°46′16″N 82°38′28″W	St. Petersburg	
2	Abercrombie Site Complex	Abercrombie Site Complex	October 11, 2019 (#100004520)	Address Restricted	St. Petersburg	
3	Anclote Key Lighthouse	Anclote Key Lighthouse	April 1, 1999 (#99000410)	Southern end of Anclote Key Island; 28°10′00″N 82°50′42″W	Anclote Key Island	
4	Andrews Memorial Chapel	Andrews Memorial Chapel	July 31, 1972 (#72000346)	Buena Vista and San Mateo; 28°02′03″N 82°47′03″W	Dunedin	
5	Arcade Hotel	Arcade Hotel	January 12, 1984 (#84000943)	210 Pinellas Avenue; 28°08′40″N 82°45′24″W	Tarpon Springs	
6	N. G. Arfaras Sponge Packing House	N. G. Arfaras Sponge Packing House	April 10, 1991 (#91000412)	26 West Park Street; 28°09′00″N 82°45′26″W	Tarpon Springs	
7	Bay Pines Site (8Pi64)	Bay Pines Site (8Pi64)	February 23, 1983 (#83001443)	Address Restricted	Bay Pines	
8	Bay Pines Veterans Administration Home and Hospital Historic District	Bay Pines Veterans Administration Home and Hospital Historic District	June 27, 2012 (#12000363)	10000 Bay Pines Blvd. 27°48′49″N 82°46′41″W	Bay Pines	United States Second Generation Veterans Hospitals MPS
9	Willis S. Blatchley House	Willis S. Blatchley House	September 23, 2009 (#09000747)	232 Lee Street; 28°01′11″N 82°47′24″W	Dunedin	
10	Boone House	Boone House	July 3, 1986 (#86001457)	601 Fifth Avenue North; 27°46′38″N 82°38′31″W	St. Petersburg	
11	Casa Coe da Sol	Casa Coe da Sol	July 17, 1980 (#80000963)	510 Park Street; 27°46′39″N 82°44′46″W	St. Petersburg	
12	Casa De Muchas Flores	Casa De Muchas Flores	January 31, 1985 (#85000160)	1446 Park Street North; 27°47′11″N 82°45′09″W	St. Petersburg	
13	Central High School	Central High School	August 1, 1984 (#84000946)	2501-5th Avenue North; 27°46′40″N 82°40′06″W	St. Petersburg	Now part of St. Petersburg High School
14	Civitan Beach House		April 8, 2021 (#100006377)	18602-18604 Gulf Blvd. 27°50′21″N 82°50′20″W	Indian Shores	
15	Cleveland Street Post Office	Cleveland Street Post Office	August 7, 1980 (#80000962)	636 Cleveland Street; 27°57′56″N 82°47′50″W	Clearwater	
16	Cycadia Cemetery	Cycadia Cemetery	March 20, 2019 (#100003522)	1105 E. Tarpon Ave. 28°08′47″N 82°44′21″W	Tarpon Springs	
17	Dennis Hotel	Dennis Hotel	April 17, 1986 (#86000804)	326 First Avenue North; 27°46′12″N 82°37′33″W	St. Petersburg	
18	Domestic Science and Manual Training School	Domestic Science and Manual Training School	October 14, 1999 (#99001250)	440–442 Second Avenue North; 27°46′22″N 82°38′22″W	St. Petersburg	
19	Don Ce Sar Hotel	Don Ce Sar Hotel	April 3, 1975 (#75000563)	3400 Gulf Boulevard; 27°42′32″N 82°44′15″W	St. Pete Beach	
20	J. O. Douglas House	J. O. Douglas House	November 29, 1979 (#79000691)	209 Scotland Street; 28°00′38″N 82°47′29″W	Dunedin	
21	Downtown St. Petersburg Historic District	Downtown St. Petersburg Historic District	April 30, 2004 (#04000364)	Bounded by 5th Avenue North, Beach Drive Northeast, Central Avenue, and 9th Street North; 27°46′34″N 82°38′19″W	St. Petersburg	
22	Duchess (Sponge Hooking Boat)	Duchess (Sponge Hooking Boat)	August 2, 1990 (#90001133)	Tarpon Springs Sponge Docks at Dodecanese Boulevard; 28°09′19″N 82°45′43″W	Tarpon Springs	Part of the Tarpon Springs Sponge Boats MPS
23	Dunedin Isles Golf Club Golf Course	Dunedin Isles Golf Club Golf Course	June 4, 2014 (#14000283)	1050 Palm Blvd. 28°02′30″N 82°46′36″W	Dunedin	
24	First Methodist Church of St. Petersburg	First Methodist Church of St. Petersburg	September 13, 1990 (#90001433)	212 Third Street, North; 27°46′31″N 82°38′15″W	St. Petersburg	
25	Fort Desoto Batteries	Fort Desoto Batteries	December 2, 1977 (#77000407)	8 miles (13 km) south of St. Petersburg on Mullet Key; 27°36′53″N 82°44′13″W	St. Petersburg	
26	George N. Cretekos (Sponge Diving Boat)	George N. Cretekos (Sponge Diving Boat)	August 3, 1990 (#90001135)	Tarpon Springs Sponge Docks at Dodecanese Boulevard; 28°09′19″N 82°45′43″W	Tarpon Springs	Part of the Tarpon Springs Sponge Boats MPS
27	Green-Richman Arcade	Green-Richman Arcade	January 30, 1998 (#98000027)	689 Central Avenue; 27°46′17″N 82°38′37″W	St. Petersburg	
28	Gulfport Casino	Gulfport Casino	August 8, 2014 (#14000477)	5500 Shore Blvd. 27°44′15″N 82°42′28″W	Gulfport	
29	Harbor Oaks Residential District	Harbor Oaks Residential District	March 15, 1988 (#87002133)	Roughly bounded by Druid Road, South Fort Harrison Avenue, Lotus Path, & Clearwater Harbor; 27°57′21″N 82°48′11″W	Clearwater	
30	James Henry House	James Henry House	April 16, 2013 (#13000164)	950 12th St., N. 27°46′54″N 82°39′04″W	St. Petersburg	
31	House at 827 Mandalay Avenue		February 2, 2021 (#100006118)	827 Mandalay Ave. 27°59′41″N 82°49′37″W	Clearwater	
32	Huggins-Stengel Field	Huggins-Stengel Field	August 27, 2019 (#100004348)	1320 5th St. North; 27°47′09″N 82°38′24″W	St. Petersburg	
33	Ingleside	Ingleside	April 28, 1992 (#92000405)	333 South Bayshore Boulevard; 27°59′18″N 82°41′25″W	Safety Harbor	
34	Louis Johnson Building	Louis Johnson Building	December 3, 1987 (#87001632)	161 First Street, Southwest; 27°54′55″N 82°47′19″W	Largo	
35	Jungle Prada Site	Jungle Prada Site	February 4, 2003 (#03000007)	Address Restricted; 27°47′19″N 82°45′08″W	St. Petersburg	
36	Kenwood Historic District	Kenwood Historic District	August 4, 2003 (#03000729)	Roughly bounded by 9th Avenue, 19th Street, 1st Avenue, 31st Street, 5th Ave, and 34th Street; 27°40′40″N 82°41′08″W	St. Petersburg	
37	S. H. Kress and Company Building	S. H. Kress and Company Building	October 1, 2001 (#01001057)	475 Central Avenue; 27°46′15″N 82°38′25″W	St. Petersburg	
38	Maximo Beach Site	Maximo Beach Site	October 11, 2019 (#100004521)	Address Restricted	St. Petersburg	
39	John & Florence McKeage House	John & Florence McKeage House	April 9, 2013 (#13000145)	209 Park St., S. 27°46′08″N 82°44′29″W	St. Petersburg	
40	E. R. Meres Sponge Packing House	E. R. Meres Sponge Packing House	April 10, 1991 (#91000411)	106 Read Street; 28°08′57″N 82°45′42″W	Tarpon Springs	
41	Mount Olive African Methodist Episcopal Church	Mount Olive African Methodist Episcopal Church	February 3, 2000 (#99000802)	600 Jones Street; 27°58′08″N 82°47′54″W	Clearwater	
42	N. K. Symi (Sponge Diving Boat)	N. K. Symi (Sponge Diving Boat)	August 2, 1990 (#90001132)	Tarpon Springs Sponge Docks at Dodecanese Boulevard; 28°09′19″N 82°45′43″W	Tarpon Springs	Part of the Tarpon Springs Sponge Boats MPS
43	North Shore Historic District	North Shore Historic District	February 20, 2003 (#03000040)	Bounded by 4th Street, 5th Avenue, Tampa Bay, and 30th Ave; 27°47′17″N 82°37′58″W	St. Petersburg	
44	North Ward School		September 29, 2021 (#100007057)	900 North Fort Harrison Ave. 27°58′30″N 82°47′56″W	Clearwater	
45	Old Belleair Town Hall	Old Belleair Town Hall	May 6, 1994 (#94000421)	903 Ponce de Leon Boulevard; 27°56′05″N 82°48′14″W	Belleair	
46	Old Pinellas County Courthouse	Old Pinellas County Courthouse	June 25, 1992 (#92000828)	315 Court Street; 27°57′43″N 82°48′05″W	Clearwater	
47	Old Tarpon Springs City Hall	Old Tarpon Springs City Hall	August 10, 1990 (#90001117)	101 South Pinellas Avenue; 28°08′42″N 82°45′24″W	Tarpon Springs	
48	Old Tarpon Springs High School	Old Tarpon Springs High School	October 11, 1990 (#90001538)	324 East Pine Street; 28°09′02″N 82°45′06″W	Tarpon Springs	
49	Pass-a-Grille Historic District	Pass-a-Grille Historic District	October 19, 1989 (#89001734)	Roughly bounded by 12th Avenue, Gulf Boulevard, 4th Avenue, and Gulf Avenue; 27°41′17″N 82°44′14″W	St. Pete Beach	There was a boundary increase on September 15, 2003 (refnum 03000943)
50	Peninsular Fruit Company Building	Peninsular Fruit Company Building	April 26, 2023 (#100008871)	10000 Gandy Blvd. North; 27°51′50″N 82°38′16″W	St. Petersburg	
51	Potter House	Potter House	June 13, 1986 (#86001258)	577 Second Street South; 27°45′51″N 82°38′09″W	St. Petersburg	Demolished by 1990
52	Princess Mound Site	Princess Mound Site	October 10, 2019 (#100004522)	Address Restricted	St. Petersburg vicinity	
53	Donald Roebling Estate	Donald Roebling Estate	December 19, 1979 (#79000689)	700 Orange Avenue; 27°57′27″N 82°48′17″W	Clearwater	
54	Rose Hill Cemetery	Rose Hill Cemetery	March 7, 2017 (#100000711)	0 Jasmine Avenue; 28°08′55″N 82°44′06″W	Tarpon Springs	
55	Roser Park Historic District	Roser Park Historic District	April 1, 1998 (#98000295)	Roughly bounded by 5th and 9th Streets South and 6th and 11th Avenues South; 27°45′35″N 82°38′31″W	St. Petersburg	
56	Maurice and Thelma Rothman House	Maurice and Thelma Rothman House	February 27, 2013 (#13000034)	1018 Park St., N. 27°46′54″N 82°44′57″W	St. Petersburg	
57	Round Lake Historic District	Round Lake Historic District	September 29, 2003 (#03000824)	Roughly 5th Avenue, 9th Street, 13th Avenue, and 4th Street; 27°46′51″N 82°38′28″W	St. Petersburg	
58	Safety Harbor Site	Safety Harbor Site	October 15, 1966 (#66000270)	Address Restricted; 28°00′27″N 82°40′48″W	Safety Harbor	
59	Safford House	Safford House	October 16, 1974 (#74000654)	Parken Place; 28°08′53″N 82°45′36″W	Tarpon Springs	
60	St. Nicholas III (Sponge Diving Boat)	St. Nicholas III (Sponge Diving Boat)	August 3, 1990 (#90001136)	Tarpon Springs Sponge Docks at Dodecanese Boulevard; 28°09′19″N 82°45′43″W	Tarpon Springs	Part of the Tarpon Springs Sponge Boats MPS
61	St. Nicholas VI (Sponge Diving Boat)	St. Nicholas VI (Sponge Diving Boat)	August 3, 1990 (#90001134)	Tarpon Springs Sponge Docks at Dodecanese Boulevard; 28°09′19″N 82°45′43″W	Tarpon Springs	Part of the Tarpon Springs Sponge Boats MPS
62	St. Petersburg Lawn Bowling Club	St. Petersburg Lawn Bowling Club	July 9, 1980 (#80004602)	536 4th Avenue, North; 27°46′33″N 82°38′27″W	St. Petersburg	
63	St. Petersburg Public Library	St. Petersburg Public Library	June 13, 1986 (#86001259)	280 Fifth Street North; 27°46′29″N 82°38′26″W	St. Petersburg	
64	St. Petersburg Woman's Club	St. Petersburg Woman's Club	July 15, 1994 (#94000708)	40 Snell Isle Boulevard; 27°47′34″N 82°38′10″W	St. Petersburg	
65	Sanitary Public Market	Sanitary Public Market	June 27, 2002 (#02000680)	1825 4th Street North; 27°47′24″N 82°38′18″W	St. Petersburg	
66	Snell Arcade	Snell Arcade	November 4, 1982 (#82001037)	405 Central Avenue; 27°46′16″N 82°38′20″W	St. Petersburg	
67	South Ward School	South Ward School	June 18, 1979 (#79000690)	610 South Fort Harrison Avenue; 27°57′29″N 82°48′02″W	Clearwater	
68	Studebaker Building	Studebaker Building	July 5, 1985 (#85001485)	600 Fourth Street South; 27°45′49″N 82°38′18″W	St. Petersburg	
69	Sunset Hotel	Sunset Hotel	November 24, 2014 (#14000952)	7401 Central Ave. 27°46′17″N 82°44′28″W	St. Petersburg	
70	Tarpon Springs Greektown Historic District	Tarpon Springs Greektown Historic District	June 2, 2014 (#14000321)	Bounded by Dodecanese & Roosevelt Blvds., W. Tarpon & N. Pinellas Aves. 28°09′08″N 82°45′36″W	Tarpon Springs	
71	Tarpon Springs Historic District	Tarpon Springs Historic District	December 6, 1990 (#90001762)	Roughly bounded by Read Street, Hibiscus Street, Orange Street, Levis Avenue, Lemon Street, and Spring Bayou; 28°09′04″N 82°47′13″W	Tarpon Springs	
72	U.S. Post Office	U.S. Post Office	April 4, 1975 (#75000564)	Southwestern corner of 1st Avenue North and 4th Street North; 27°46′17″N 82°38′21″W	St. Petersburg	
73	Veillard House	Veillard House	October 29, 1982 (#82001038)	262 North 4th Avenue; 27°46′34″N 82°38′24″W	St. Petersburg	
74	Vinoy Park Hotel	Vinoy Park Hotel	September 11, 1978 (#78000955)	501 Fifth Avenue Northeast; 27°46′41″N 82°37′44″W	St. Petersburg	
75	Weedon Island Site	Weedon Island Site	June 13, 1972 (#72000347)	Address Restricted; 27°50′42″N 82°36′07″W	St. Petersburg	
76	John C. Williams House	John C. Williams House	April 24, 1975 (#75000565)	444 5th Avenue South; 27°45′55″N 82°38′23″W	St. Petersburg	

== Former listings ==
	Name on the Register	Image	Date listed	Date removed	Location	City or town	Description
1	Belleview-Biltmore Hotel	Belleview-Biltmore Hotel	December 26, 1979 (#79000687)	October 2, 2017	Off State Road 697; 27°56′37″N 82°49′06″W	Clearwater	Mostly torn down. Pieces of the original structure were kept and are being utilized for other purposes.
2	Louis Ducros House	Louis Ducros House	July 2, 1979 (#79000688)	September 2, 2009	622 Belleview Boulevard; 27°56′41″N 82°47′50″W	Clearwater	Relocated from original address at 1324 South Fort Harrison Street.
3	Tarpon Springs Sponge Exchange		July 24, 1972 (#72000348)	October 10, 1984	Dodecanese St.	Tarpon Springs	

== See also ==
- List of National Historic Landmarks in Florida
- National Register of Historic Places listings in Florida
