= Ponce De Leon Boutique Hotel =

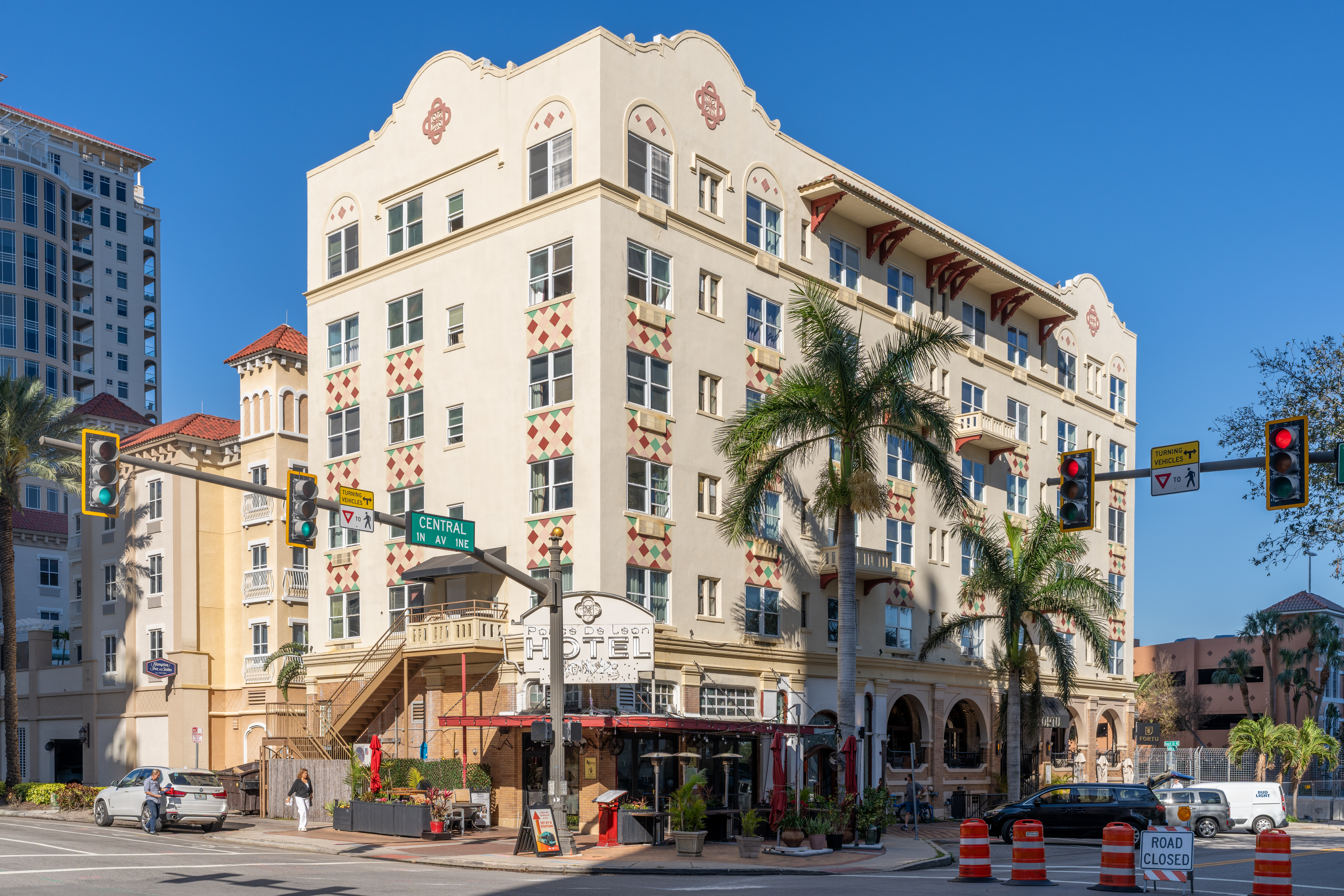
- (2025)

- Location within Florida

General information
- Architectural style: Mission Revival
- Location: 95 Central Avenue, St. Petersburg, Florida, United States
- Coordinates: 27°46′17.10″N 82°38′01.16″W
- Completed: 1922

Technical details
- Floor count: 6

Design and construction
- Architect: George Feltham

Website
- Ponce De Leon Boutique Hotel

The Ponce De Leon Boutique Hotel, also known as Hotel Ponce De Leon in St. Petersburg, Florida, is a historic landmark and Mission Revival hotel in Downtown St. Petersburg, Florida. It is located at 95 Central Avenue, and on the corner of 10 Beach Drive. It was added to the Pinellas County Historic Preservation Committee in December 1997 (HPC #97-04).

== History ==
Postcard of The Ponce De Leon Boutique Hotel Built in 1922

The Ponce De Leon is a Mission style hotel constructed in 1922 during the beginning of the Florida Land Boom, a period which saw St. Petersburg develop into a major resort city. It was the first major hotel in St. Petersburg to be situated along the waterfront and represents the transition from small scale, mainly frame boarding houses and hotels built before the World War I era to the large, masonry hotels built in the boom years of 1921–26. Hotels built in St. Petersburg before 1920 were small, usually less than 50 rooms, and entirely financed by their owner-operators. The first hotels built after the war in St. Petersburg, the Alexander in 1919 and the Cordova in 1921, show a change to masonry construction and architectural sophistication, but remained small in size. This shift in hotel type was a reflection of the growing wealth of the American economy in this period and the increased popularity of Florida as a winter tourist destination.

Designed by George Feltham, the locally notable architect also responsible for the First Baptist Church and the Green-Richman Arcade, the Ponce De Leon is a six-story steel framed structure with concrete exterior clad in smooth stucco. It is rectangular in plan and contains a basement along the east half of the building. Typical of this style is the building's flat roof, which is surrounded by a Mission-style parapet wall trimmed with art stone coping. Art stone quatrefoil served as a centerpiece underneath each shaped parapet. The building presents its prominent face to the south, which contains the main entrance. The original entrance, located asymmetrically along the eastern half of the south facade, was punctuated by five round art stone arches supported by brick piers. The tan brick piers are topped with art stone caps and a cornice with frieze bands on the east, south, and west facades of the building. The open arcaded entrance porch, which provided the transition from the street level to the lobby, was later enclosed as the entrance was relocated just to the west. To the west of the original entrance were three store-fronts covered with decorative metal awnings suspended by chains. The south facade, which faces Central Avenue, features four symmetrically placed balconies and a cantilevered tile roof supported by decorative wood brackets. According to the original plans, this roof, which is centered between two parapets, was to be laid with green Spanish tile. Four sixth-floor windows along the south facade, located just below the shaped parapets, feature art stone architrave with decorative inset tiles. Similar architrave are located along both the east and west facades under each shaped parapet.
