= Domestic Science Building =

Domestic Science Building may refer to:

- Domestic Science Building (Normal, Alabama), listed on the National Register of Historic Places in Madison County, Alabama
- Domestic Science Building (Arkadelphia, Arkansas), NRHP-listed
- Girls' Domestic Science and Arts Building, Russellville, Arkansas, NRHP-listed
- Domestic Science and Manual Training School, St. Petersburg, Florida, NRHP-listed
