= Dennis Hotel (disambiguation) =

Dennis Hotel may refer to:

== Hotels ==
- Dennis Hotel: listed on the National Register of Historic Places in St. Petersburg, Florida
- Dennis Hotel (Atlantic City, New Jersey): now a tower of Bally's Atlantic City

=== Other ===
- Dennis Hotels Pty Ltd v Victoria: 1960 court case before the High Court of Australia
