= James Henry House =

- U.S. National Register of Historic Places
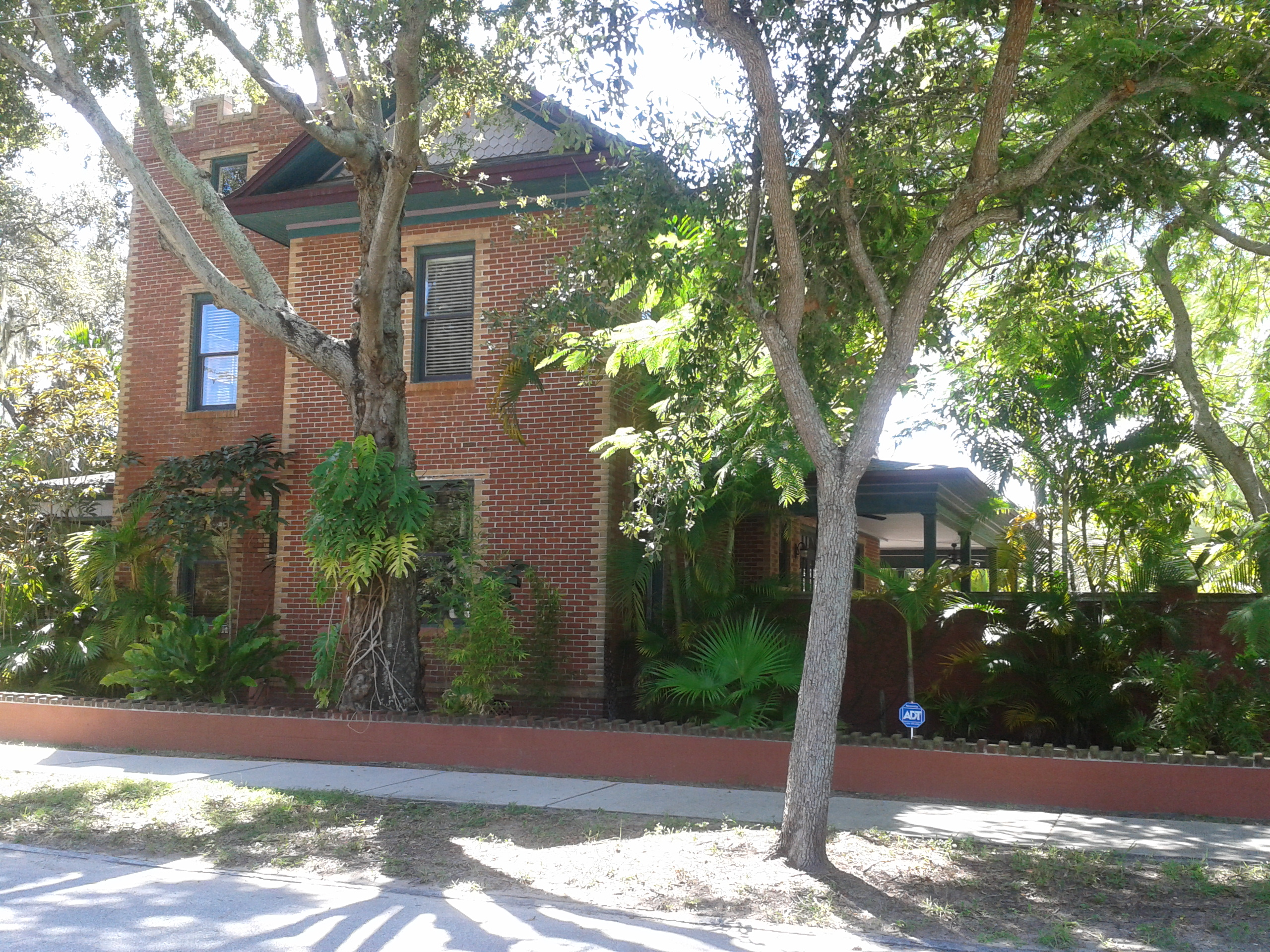
- James Henry House, September 2013

- Location within Florida Location within the United States
- Location: St. Petersburg, Florida
- Coordinates: 27°46′54″N 82°39′04″W
- NRHP reference No.: 13000164
- Added to NRHP: April 16, 2013

The James Henry House is a historic residence in St. Petersburg, Florida, United States, that is listed on the National Register of Historic Places.

== Description ==
The house is located at 950 12th Street North and was constructed in 1905 by James and Lydia Henry.

It was added to the National Register of Historic Places on April 16, 2013.

== See also ==
- National Register of Historic Places listings in Pinellas County, Florida
