= Crystal Bay Hotel =

Hotel in St. Petersburg, Florida, United States

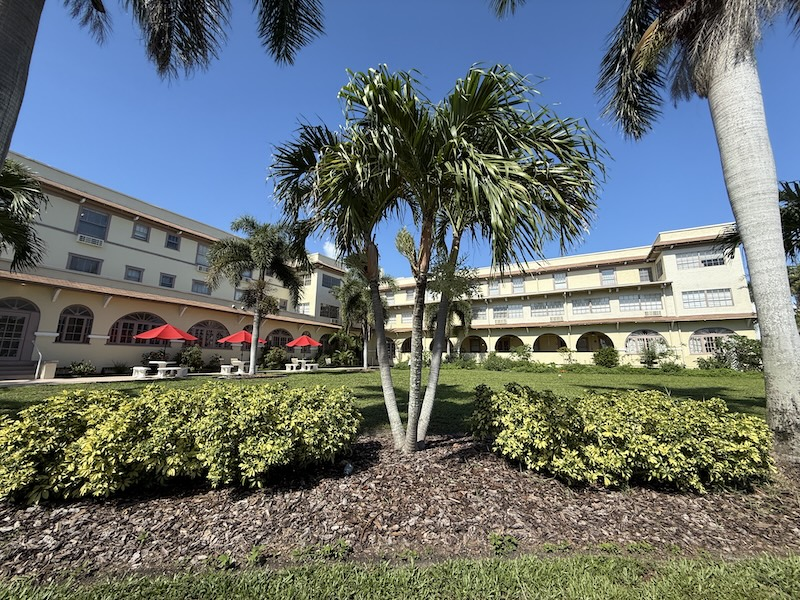
- View of Crystal Bay Hotel from Park Street

- Location within Florida

General information
- Location: 7401 Central Avenue, St. Petersburg, Florida
- Coordinates: 27.7711°N 82.7444°W
- Opening: 1915

Design and construction
- Architect: George Feltham

Other information
- Number of rooms: 60

Crystal Bay Hotel is a historic Mediterranean Revival-style hotel and bed & breakfast located in St. Petersburg, Florida at 7401 Central Avenue, near Boca Ciega Bay. Originally built in 1915 as the Sunset Hotel, the Mediterranean Revival-style building has served as a notable architectural and cultural landmark in the region. After periods of vacancy and restoration, the building was reopened as Crystal Bay Hotel.

== History ==
The hotel was originally constructed in 1915 by architect George Feltham, during the Florida land boom. Known then as the Sunset Hotel, it quickly became a popular destination for tourists and seasonal residents in the 1920s, offering views of Boca Ciega Bay and proximity to downtown St. Petersburg. The building changed hands several times throughout the 20th century and experienced periods of decline. Following a long vacancy, the building underwent significant restoration efforts in the early 2010s. In 2013, developers began a full renovation to preserve the historic architecture while updating the property for modern hospitality use. The restored building reopened to the public in 2014 as the Crystal Bay Hotel.

== Landmark designation ==
The Sunset Hotel was designated a local historic landmark by the city of St. Petersburg in 2007. On November 24, 2014, it was added to the National Register of Historic Places.

== Architecture ==
The building features Mediterranean Revival architectural elements, including arched windows, stucco walls, and a red tile roof. Its original design has been preserved through renovations, including the expansive lobby, open-air veranda, and original staircase. The exterior is landscaped with palms and native plants, consistent with its historic Florida setting.

== Current use ==
Today, the building operates as the Crystal Bay Hotel, a boutique bed & breakfast with 60 guest rooms.
