= Sunset Hotel =

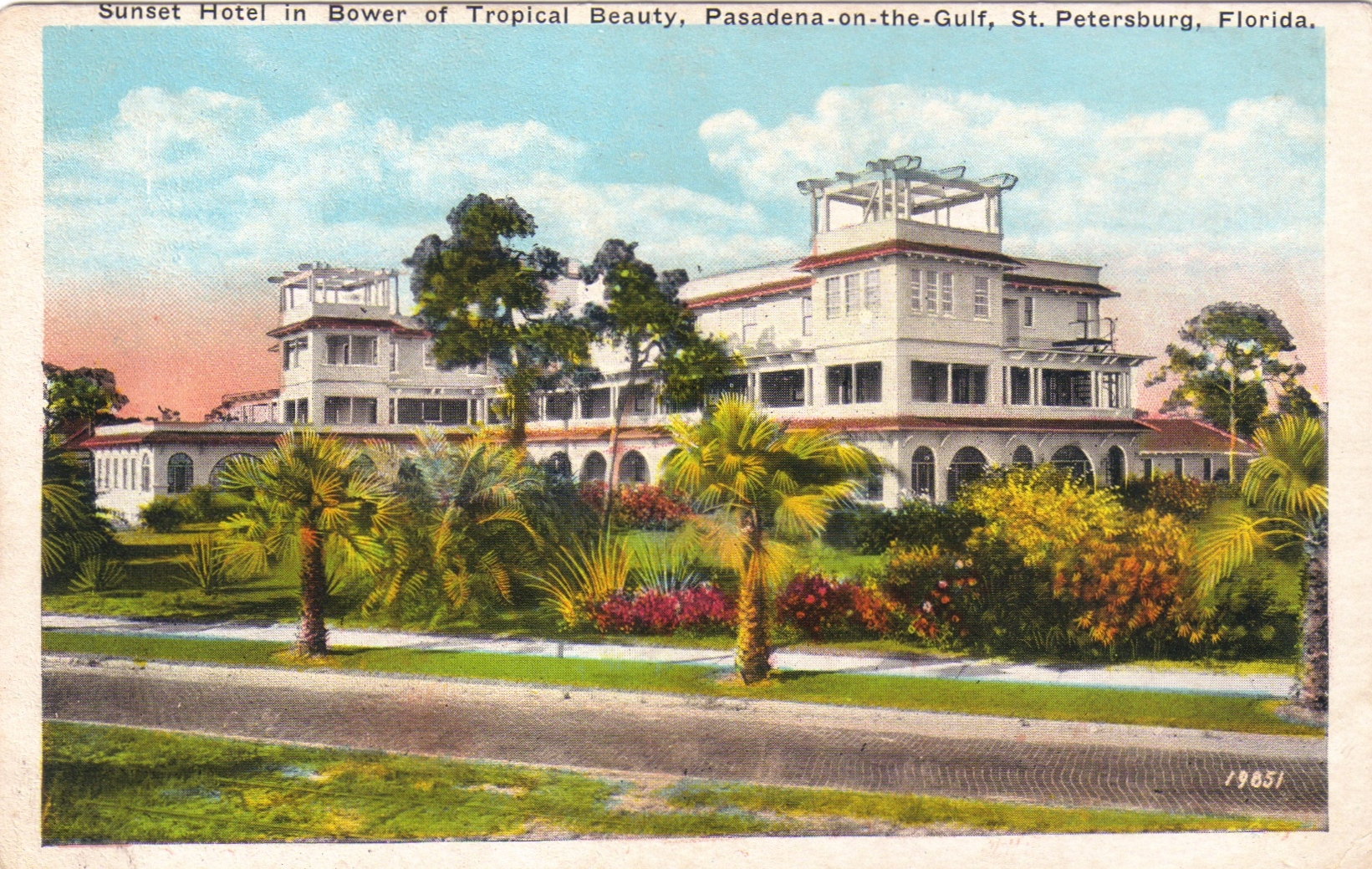
- Historic postcard of the hotel

- Location within Florida Location within the United States

General information
- Status: Operating as Crystal Bay Hotel
- Architectural style: Mission/Mediterranean Revival
- Location: St. Petersburg, Florida, 7401 Central Avenue, United States
- Coordinates: 27°46′17″N 82°44′28″W
- Opened: 1915

Technical details
- Floor count: 3

Design and construction
- Architect: George Feltham
- Designations: St. Petersburg Local Landmark (2007), National Register of Historic Places (2014)

The Sunset Hotel is a historic hotel located at 7401 Central Avenue in St. Petersburg, Florida. Designed by noted local architect George Feltham and completed in 1915, it exemplifies the Mission and Mediterranean Revival architectural styles popular during St. Petersburg’s early 20th-century boom. It operated through several real estate booms and busts and is now known as the Crystal Bay Hotel.

== History ==
The Sunset Hotel was developed by Robert W. Griggs as a centerpiece for suburban development along the trolley line built in 1913. Originally named the "Sunset Apartment Hotel", it opened in 1916 with approximately 35 apartment-style units. Seasonal winter rates ranged from $250 to $650 per unit.

In 1918, the St. Petersburg Investment Company went bankrupt, and the property was auctioned. It was purchased by Edward E. Hanna in 1919 for $30,000. In the 1920s, the hotel expanded with a new dining wing and a three-story rear addition in 1926.

During the mid-20th century, the hotel adapted to changing travel patterns. In 1958, it was converted into a year-round residential hotel, with major remodeling by then-owner Leland Thorp. By the 1970s, it operated as a retirement facility, eventually closing and falling into disrepair.

== Historic Designation ==
In 2007, the Sunset Hotel was designated a local historic landmark by the City of St. Petersburg.

On November 24, 2014, it was added to the National Register of Historic Places for its architectural integrity and historical significance in the city’s development.

== Restoration and Reuse ==
In 2013, renovation efforts began to restore the building while maintaining its historic details. In 2014–2015, the building reopened as the Crystal Bay Hotel, a boutique bed-and-breakfast featuring restored interiors, a butterfly garden, and an outdoor pool.

== Architecture ==
The hotel is a representative example of Mission and Mediterranean Revival styles, characterized by stucco walls, red tile rooflines, arched loggias, and enclosed porches. Many of these elements remain intact thanks to restoration efforts guided by the building’s National Register documentation.

== Notable Guests ==
According to historical accounts, the hotel hosted several prominent figures during its heyday, including Marilyn Monroe, Babe Ruth, and Glenn Miller.

== See also ==
- St. Petersburg, Florida
- National Register of Historic Places listings in Pinellas County, Florida
