= S. H. Kress and Co. Building (St. Petersburg, Florida) =

- U.S. National Register of Historic Places
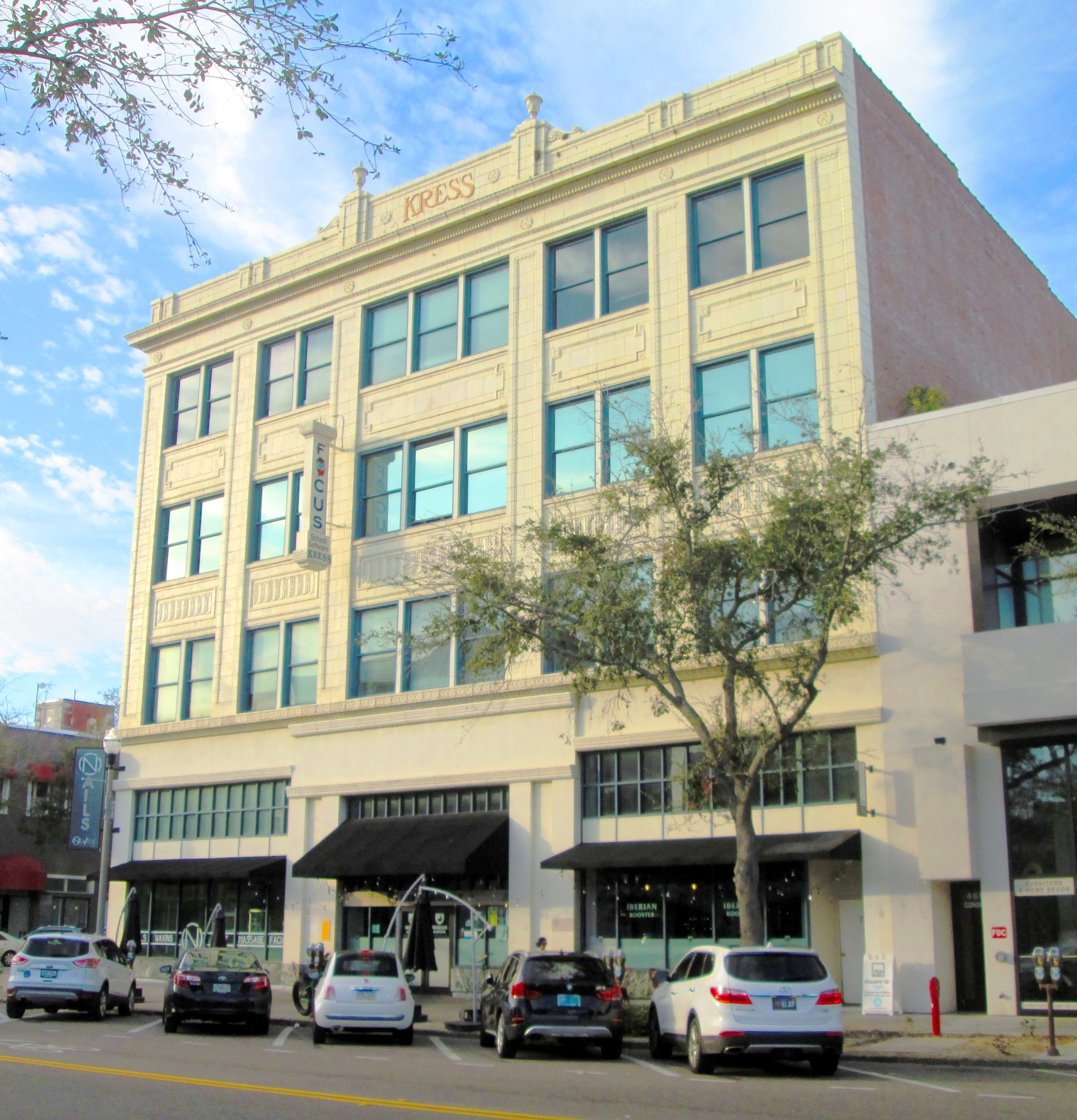
- (2018)

- Location within Florida
- Location: 475 Central Avenue; St. Petersburg, Florida
- Coordinates: 27°46′17″N 82°38′23″W
- Built: 1927
- Architect: E.J.T. Hoffman and G.A. Miller
- Architectural style: Commercial style Beaux Arts
- NRHP reference No.: 01001057
- Added to NRHP: October 1, 2001

The S. H. Kress and Co. Building, a historic building located at 475 Central Avenue at the corner of 5th Street S. in downtown St. Petersburg, Florida. It was built in 1927 in the classical Commercial style influenced by the Beaux-Arts movement. The building operated as a "five-and-dime" store from 1927 until the company closed it c.1981.

The building is located within the Downtown St. Petersburg Historic District, and was added to the National Register of Historic Places on October 1, 2001.

== Gallery ==
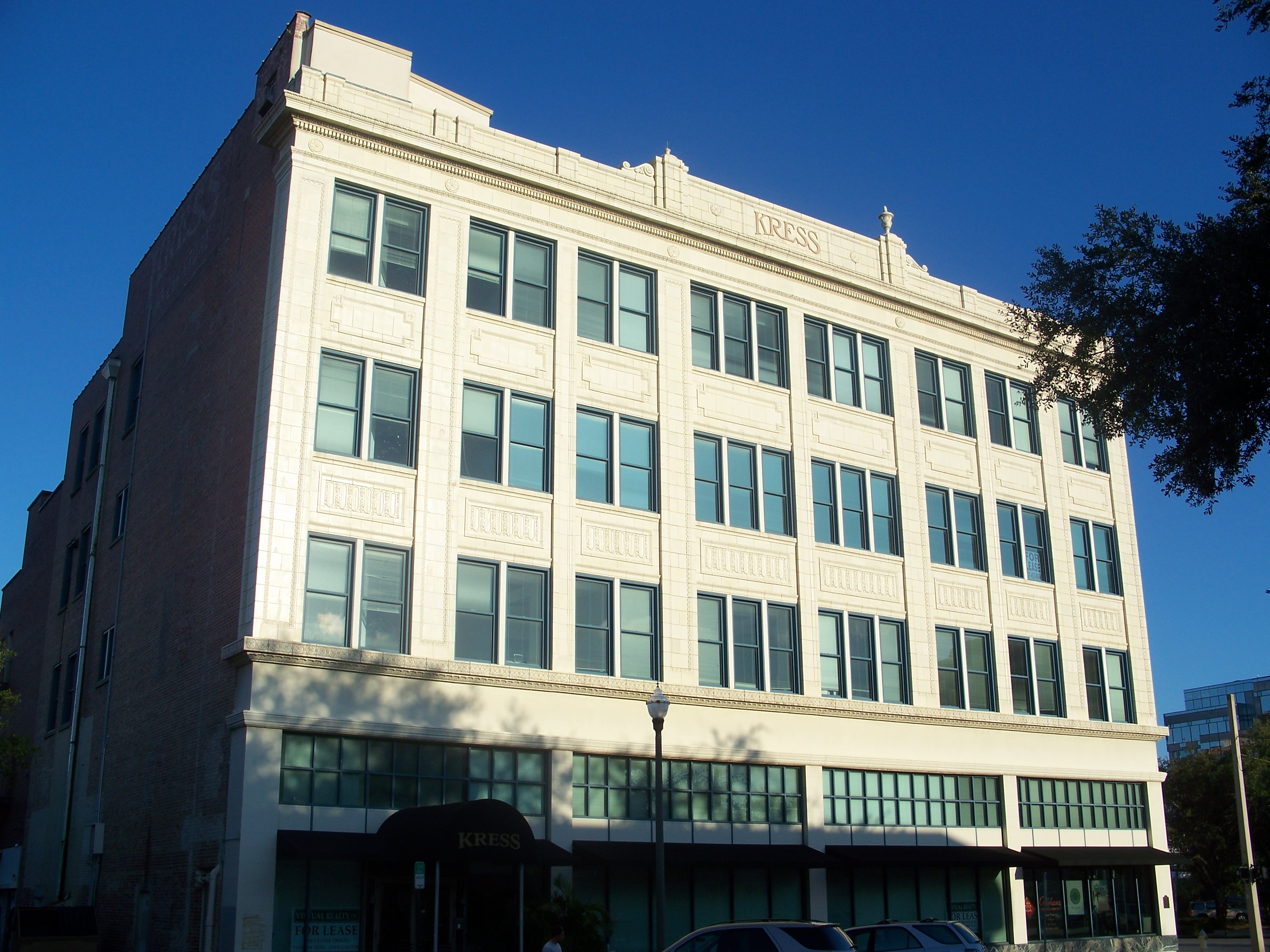
Side view

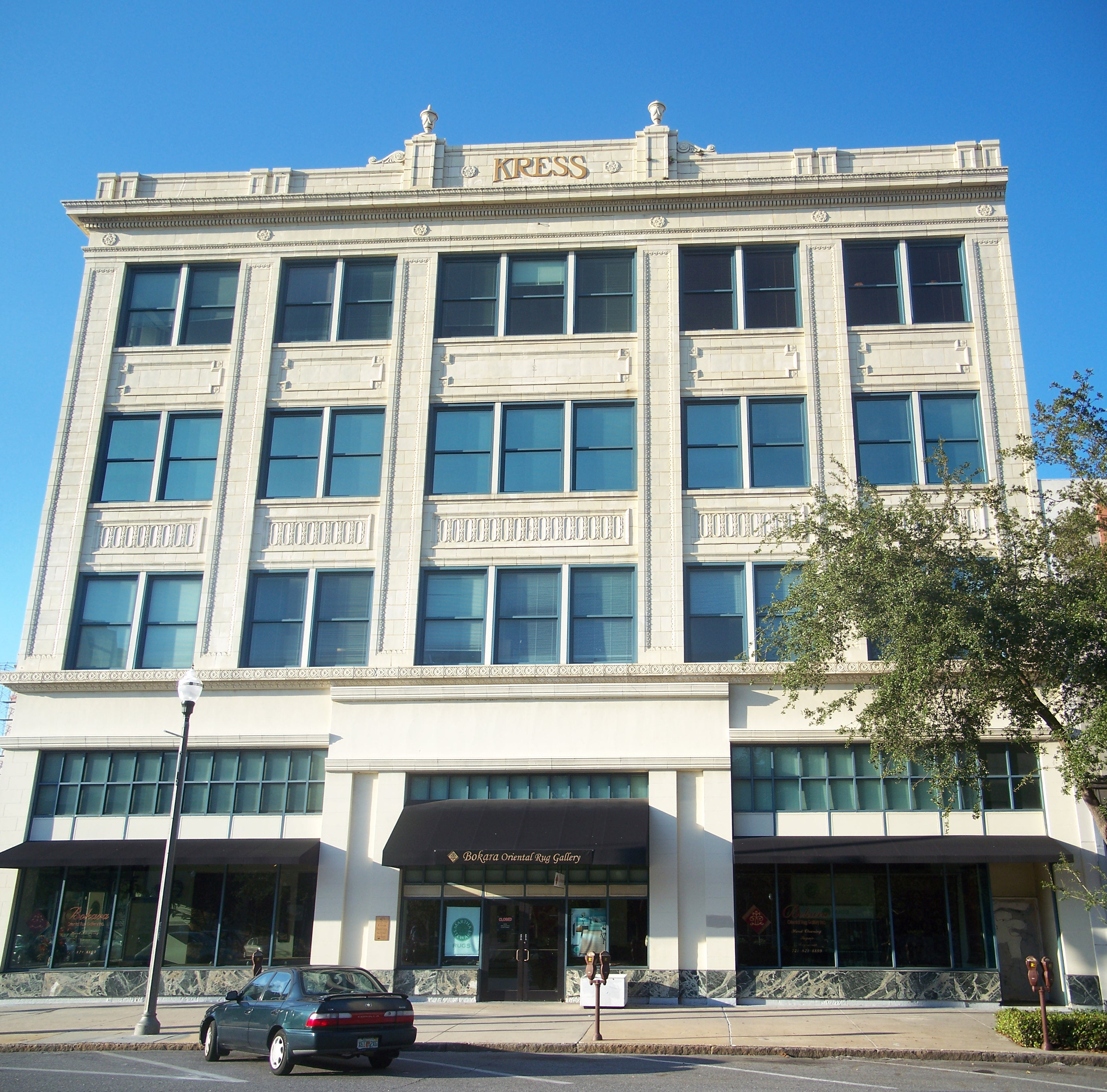
Front view, from below

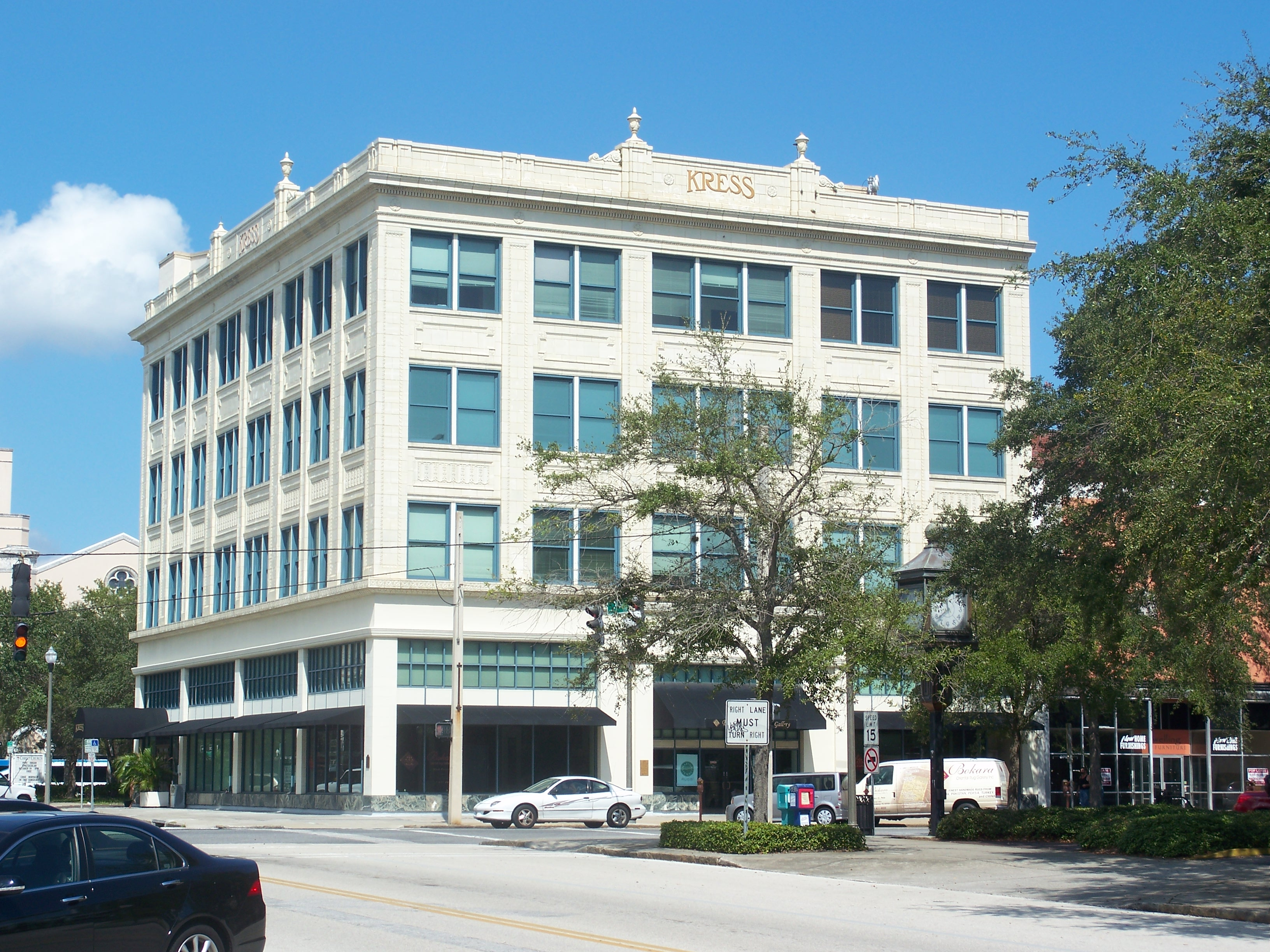
A view from the east on 5th Street St.
