= Potter House (St. Petersburg, Florida) =

Historic house in Florida, United States

- U.S. National Register of Historic Places
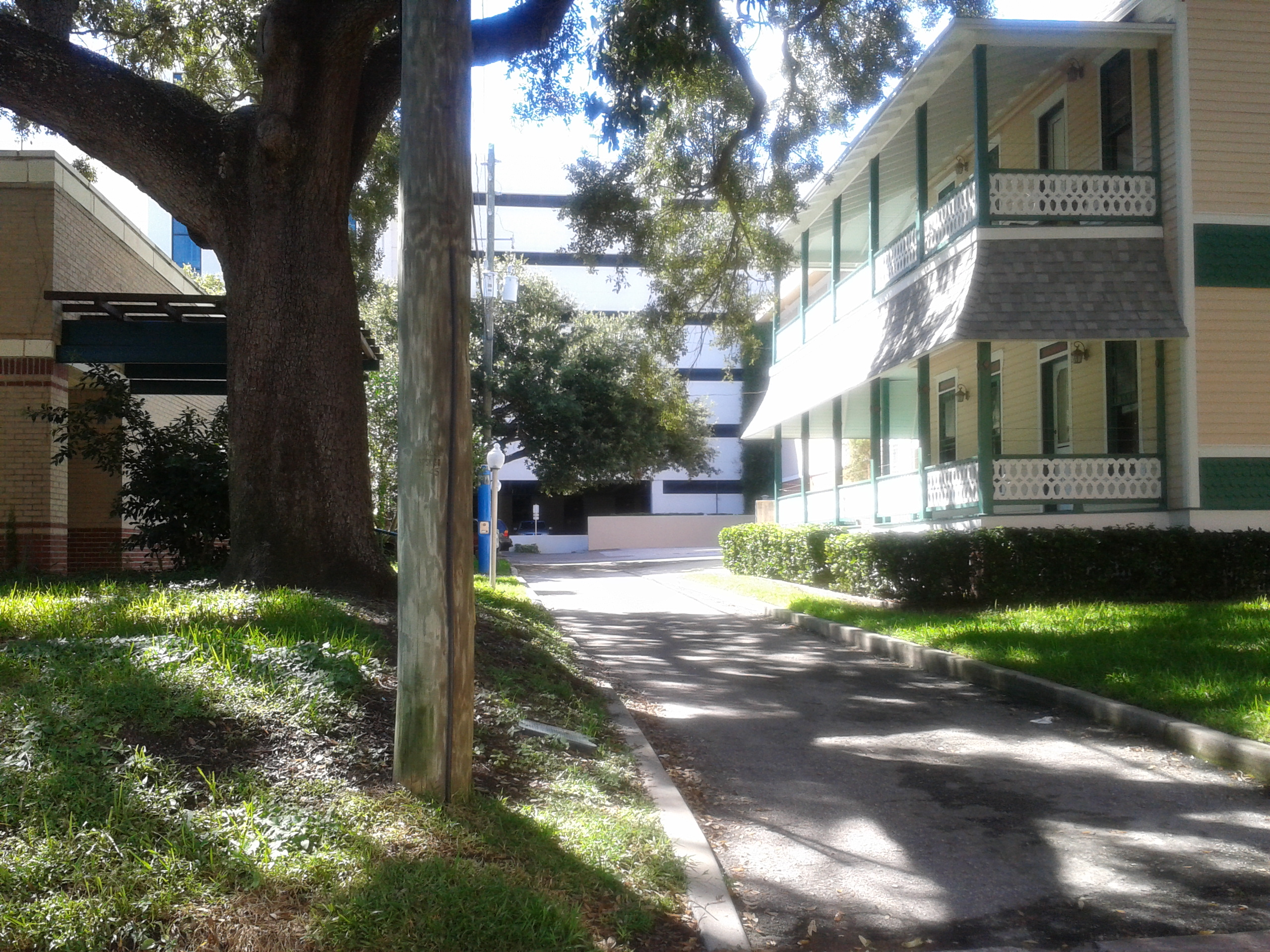
- Site of the Potter House, which was demolished in 1990

- Location within Florida Location within the United States
- Location: 577 2nd Street South, St. Petersburg, Florida
- Coordinates: 27°45′51″N 82°38′9″W
- Architectural style: Queen Anne
- NRHP reference No.: 86001258
- Added to NRHP: June 13, 1986

The Potter House was a historic home in St. Petersburg, Florida. On June 13, 1986, it was added to the U.S. National Register of Historic Places. By 1990, despite attempts by area preservationists, the house was demolished.
