= St. Petersburg Lawn Bowling Club =

- U.S. National Register of Historic Places
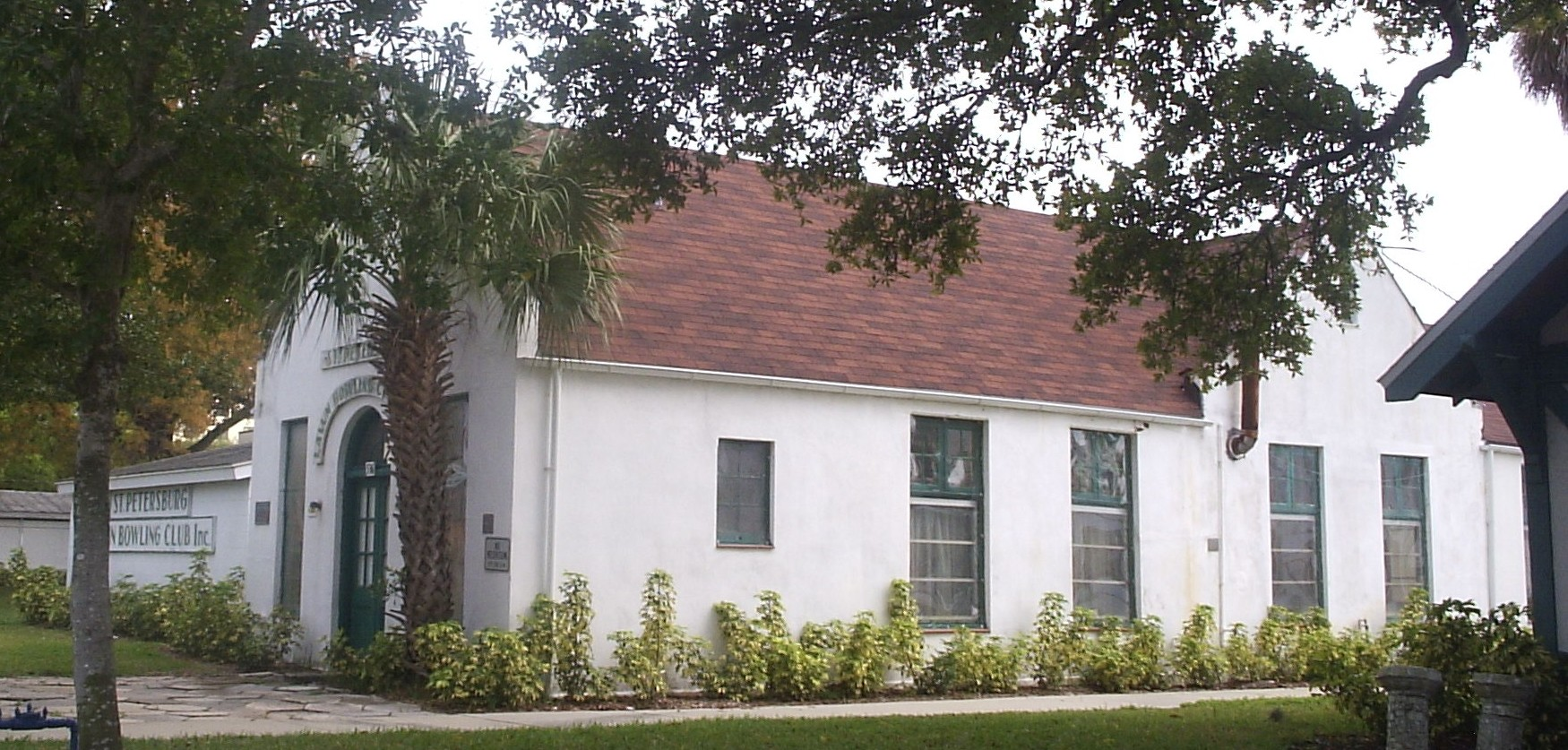

- Location within Florida Location within the United States
- Location: St. Petersburg, Florida
- Coordinates: 27°46′33″N 82°38′27″W
- NRHP reference No.: 80004602
- Added to NRHP: July 9, 1980

The St. Petersburg Lawn Bowling Club is a historic site in St. Petersburg, Florida. It is located at 536 4th Avenue, North. On July 9, 1980, it was added to the U.S. National Register of Historic Places. It is the oldest formally organized lawn bowling club in Florida and tenth in the nation. It includes members from USA, Canada, Ireland, England, Scotland, Australia, German heritage.

Club season runs November to April. Free lessons Monday, Wednesday, Friday at 9 am followed by a game until 12:00.
