= Peninsular Fruit Company Building =

- U.S. National Register of Historic Places
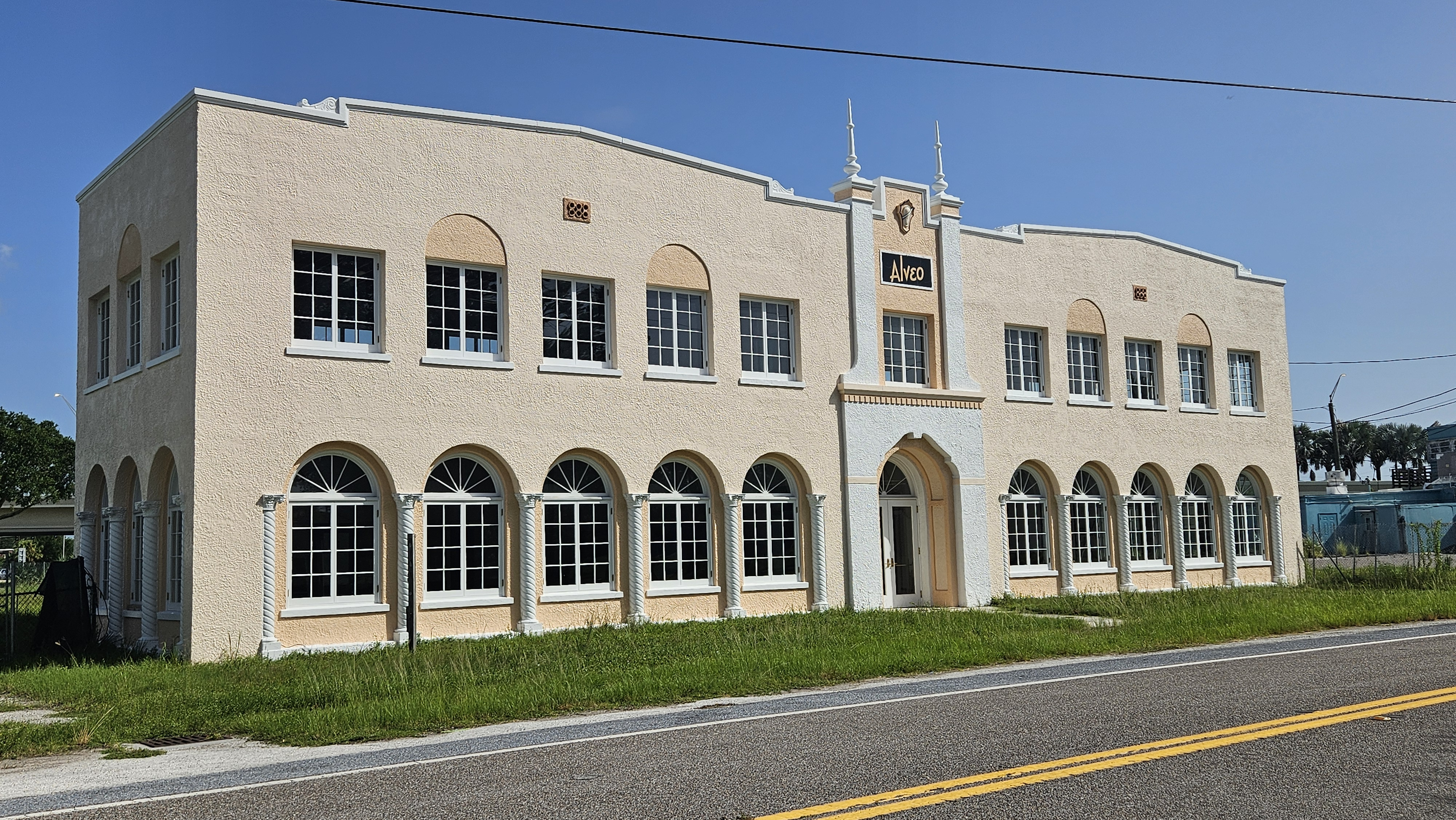
- July 2026

- Location within Florida Location within the United States
- Location: St. Petersburg, Florida
- Coordinates: 27°51′50″N 82°38′16″W
- Architectural style: Mediterranean Revival
- NRHP reference No.: 100008871
- Added to NRHP: April 26, 2023

The Peninsular Fruit Company Building is a historic commercial building located at 10000 Gandy Boulevard, North in St. Petersburg in Pinellas County, Florida. It was built c. 1924 in the Mediterranean Revival style.

It was added to the National Register of Historic Places on April 26, 2023.
