= Maurice and Thelma Rothman House =

- U.S. National Register of Historic Places
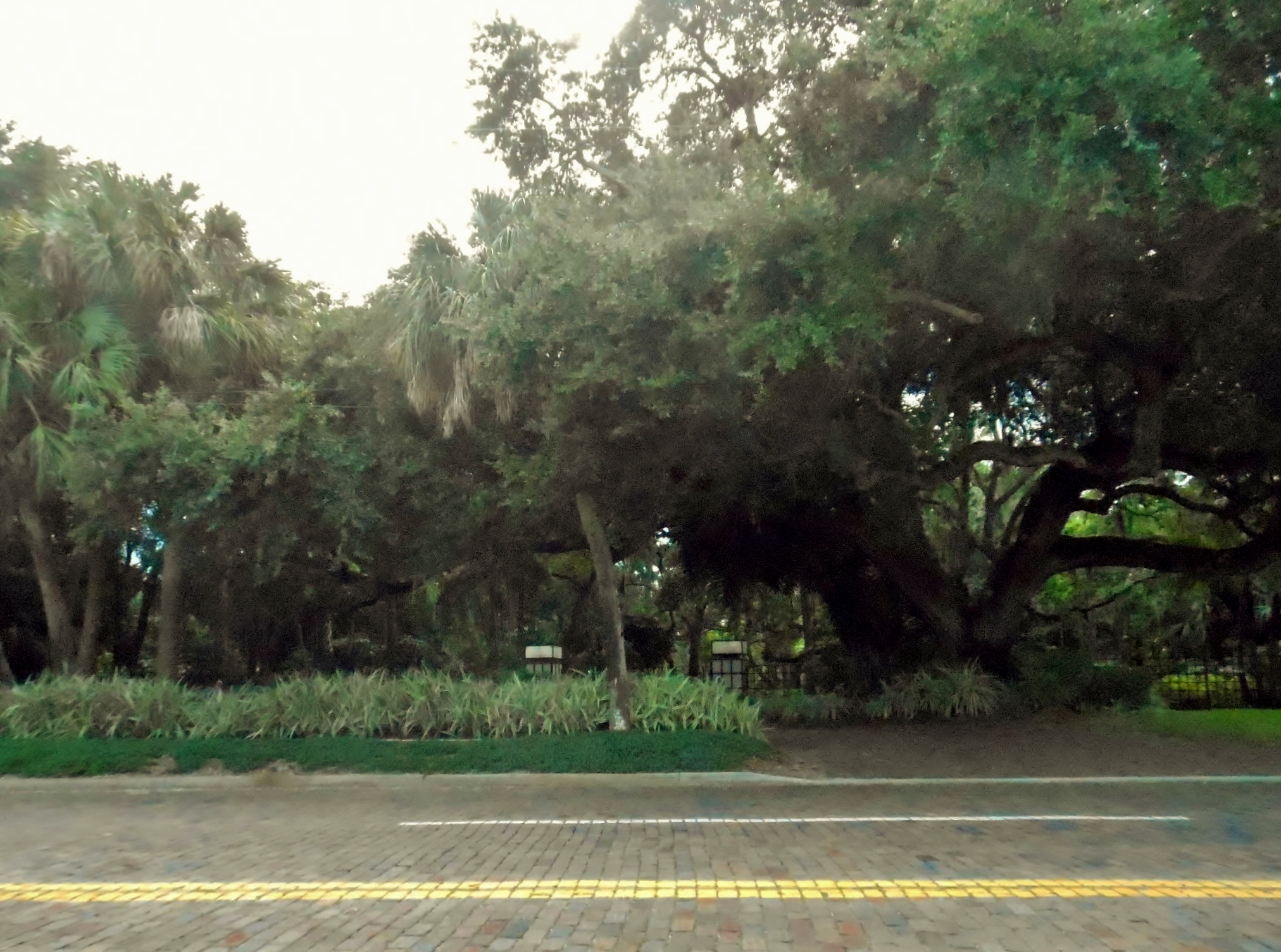

- Location within Florida Location within the United States
- Location: St. Petersburg, Florida
- Coordinates: 27°46′54″N 82°44′57″W
- NRHP reference No.: 13000034
- Added to NRHP: February 27, 2013

Maurice and Thelma Rothman House is a national historic site located at 1018 Park Street North, St. Petersburg, Florida in Pinellas County. It is an example of Mid-century modern architecture designed by the St. Petersburg architect Martin P. Fishback, Jr.

It was added to the National Register of Historic Places on February 27, 2013.
