= Casa Coe da Sol =

- U.S. National Register of Historic Places
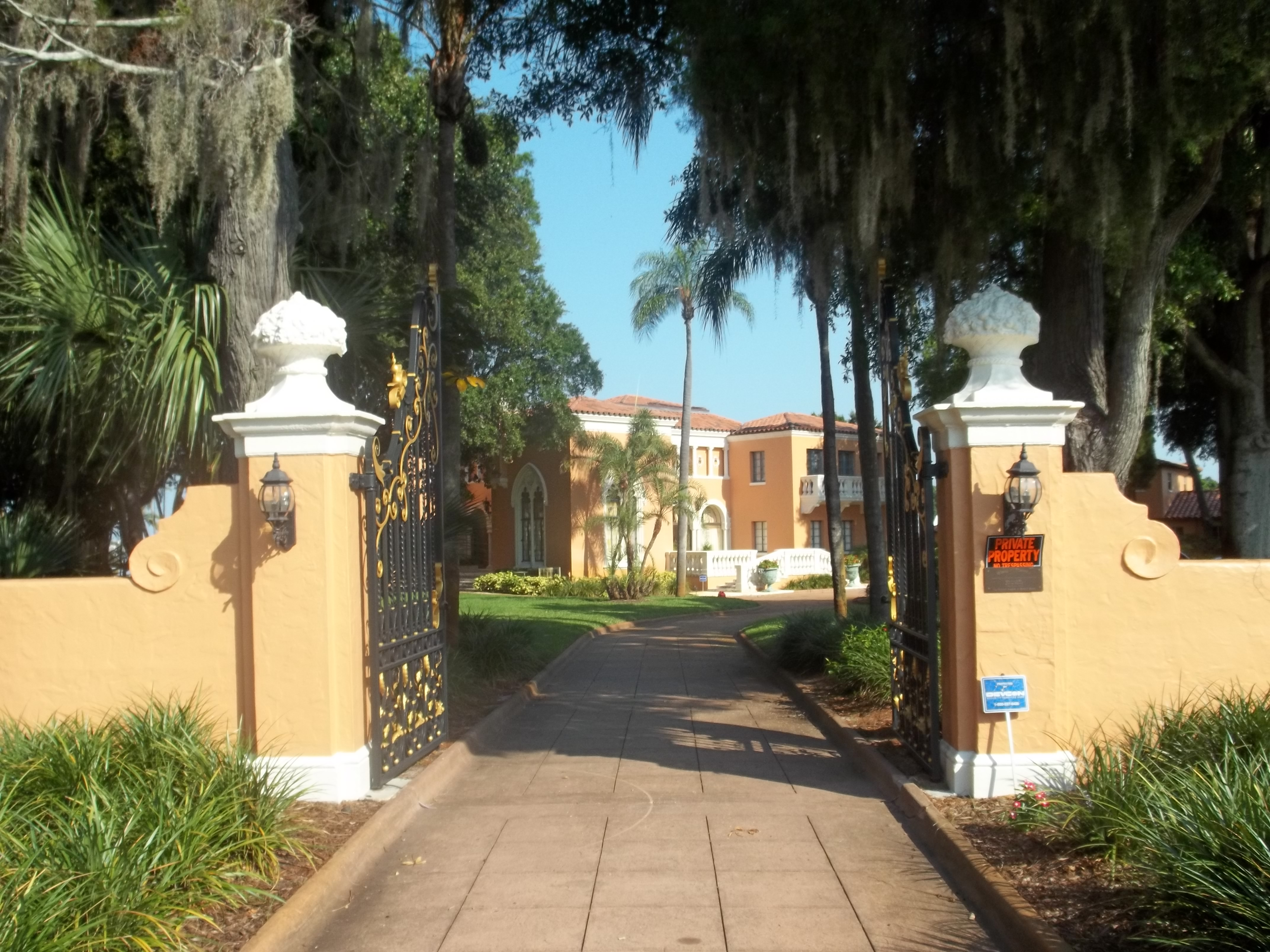

- Location within Florida Location within the United States
- Location: St. Petersburg, Florida
- Coordinates: 27°46′39″N 82°44′46″W
- NRHP reference No.: 80000963
- Added to NRHP: 17 July 1980

The Casa Coe da Sol is a historic site in St. Petersburg, Florida, United States. It is located at 510 Park Street. On July 17, 1980, it was added to the U.S. National Register of Historic Places. Casa Coe da Sol was the last commission of the famed 1920s architect Addison Mizner.
