= Alexander Hotel (St. Petersburg, Florida) =

- U.S. National Register of Historic Places
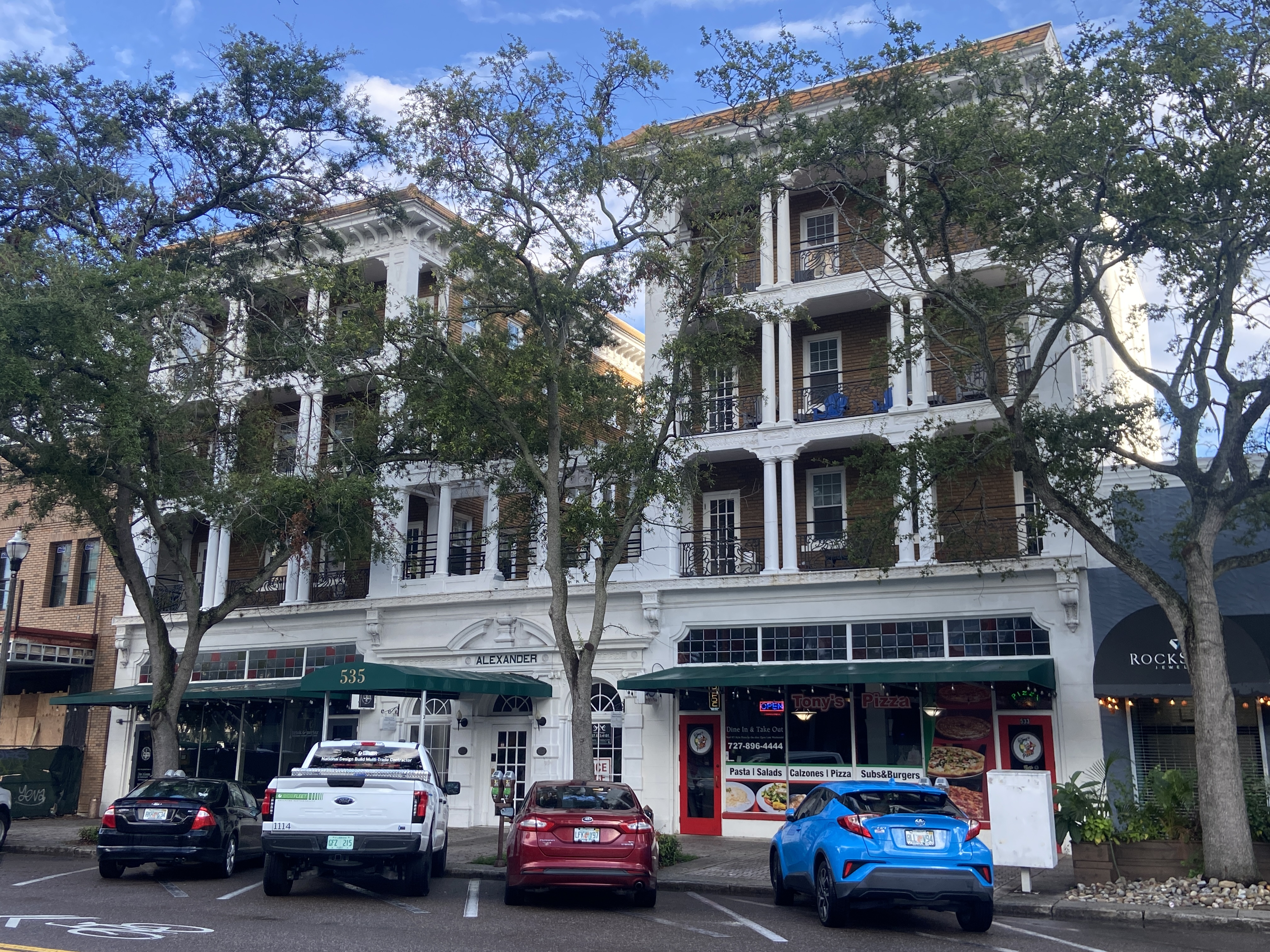
- (2024)

- Location within Florida
- Location: 535 Central Avenue; St. Petersburg, Florida
- Coordinates: 27°46′17″N 82°38′27.5″W
- Architect: Neel Reid
- NRHP reference No.: 84000200
- Added to NRHP: November 1, 1984

The Alexander Hotel is an historic hotel located at 535 Central Avenue between 5th Street S. and 6th Street S. in downtown St. Petersburg, Florida. The four-story, buff-colored brick building was built in 1919 and was designed by Neel Reid in the Classical Revival style. It has been converted to an office building. On November 1, 1984, it was added to the National Register of Historic Places. It is located within the Downtown St. Petersburg Historic District.
