= Louis Johnson Building =

Historic site in Largo, Florida, US

- U.S. National Register of Historic Places
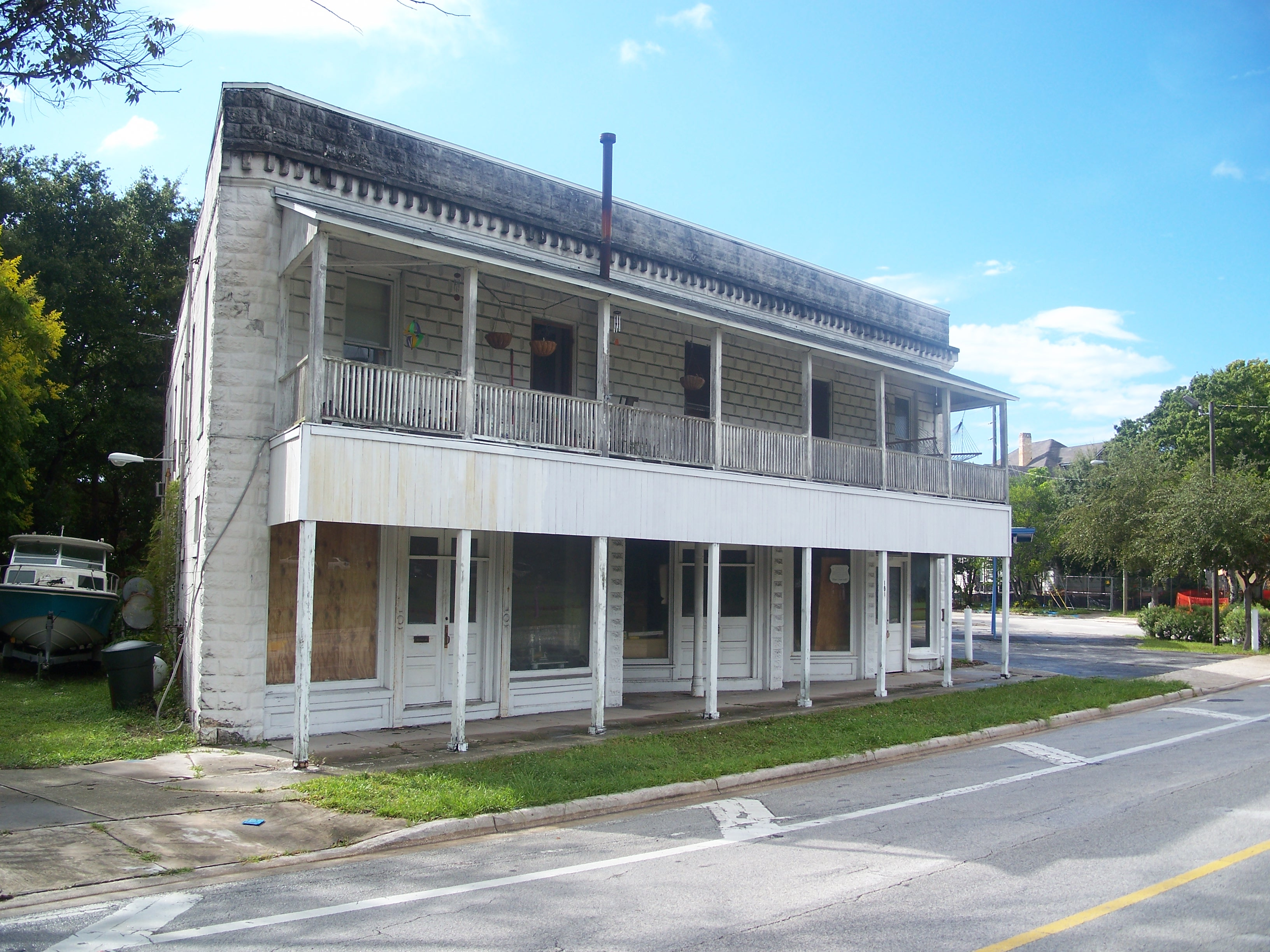

- Location within Florida Location within the United States
- Location: Largo, Florida
- Coordinates: 27°54′55″N 82°47′19″W
- NRHP reference No.: 87001632
- Added to NRHP: December 3, 1987

The Louis Johnson Building (also known as the Johnson Building) is a historic site in Largo, Florida. It is located at 161 1st Street, Southwest. On December 3, 1987, it was added to the U.S. National Register of Historic Places.

The building was originally built as a hotel by Louis Steele Johnson in 1911. In the 1950s, the hotel was converted to the Johnson Brothers Auto Machine and Supply Company. Today the first floor of the building is vacant while the second floor is the residence of Johnson's granddaughter, Joyce Siegel.

== History ==
=== Captain Charles Wharton Johnson (1829–1907) ===
Charles Johnson was from Pennsylvania, but moved to Key West, Florida, and then to Cedar Key in the late 1860s. He was married to Catherine Johnson (née Kurtz, 1831–1911), and had six children (including Louis Johnson). Charles was owner and captain of the eight ton sailing ship Evening Star, which carried mail between Cedar Key and Fort Myers in the Gulf of Mexico.

In 1870, on his was to Ft. Myers, his ship wrecked in a storm, and he was rescued by fishermen from Clearwater (near present-day Largo). Johnson was impressed by the area, and ended up purchasing a homestead overlooking Clearwater Harbor in 1872. This is sight of the Belleview-Biltmore Hotel, which would later be built in 1897 by Henry B. Plant.

After unsuccessful attempts to grow citrus groves, he moved his family to a new homestead in Largo in 1877, with additional land purchased in 1882 and 1883. Johnson became Largo's second postmaster. In 1888, the Orange Belt Railway was built in Pinellas County and crosswed the southwest section of the Johnson citrus grove. A depot was constructed about 100 yards from the Johnson House, and the town of Largo grew around it. Charles Johnson would also build the first school in Largo.

=== Louis Steele Johnson (1870–1946) ===
Son of Charles Johnson, Louis was born in 1870. He attended the school in Largo that his father had built, and entered the citrus business, as well as truck farming, specializing in cabbages. In 1896, Louis Johnson married Elizabeth McMullen, the daughter of another Largo pioneer. Their first child, Louis C. Johnson, was born in 1897 but died in infancy. Another child, a daughter named Noreen, was born in 1900.

The town of Largo was incorporated in 1905, and Johnson became the community's second mayor in 1907. Louis' father, Charles, died in 1907, and his wife Elizabeth died in 1908. Two years later, Johnson married Janie Kilgore. Their first child was Charles E. Johnson, born in 1911. The same year, Johnson's mother, Catherine, died.

From 1910 to 1911, he built the Louis Johnson Building right next to the railroad. He also built a 178-foot-deep well and a 75-foot-high 60,000-gallon water tower, the city's first municipal water system.

In late 1911, the Louis Johnson Building was ready for occupancy. The ground floor was occupied by the Largo Hardware Company, owned by Walter Geiselman, and by Louis Johnson's Drug Store and Ice Cream Parlor. The upper floor contained the Pinellas Hotel, managed by Johnson's wife. The second floor became apartments in the late 1920s.

Louise S. Johnson died in 1946, and the ownership of the building was passed to his son, Charles. The ground floor became the Johnson Brothers Auto Machine & Supply Co., while Charles and his wife Frances M. Johnson lived upstairs in the former hotel. Charles died in 1982, and the ground floor has since been vacant. As of 1986, Frances was still living on the second floor. The building was added to the U.S. National Register of Historic Places on December 3, 1987.

== Gallery ==
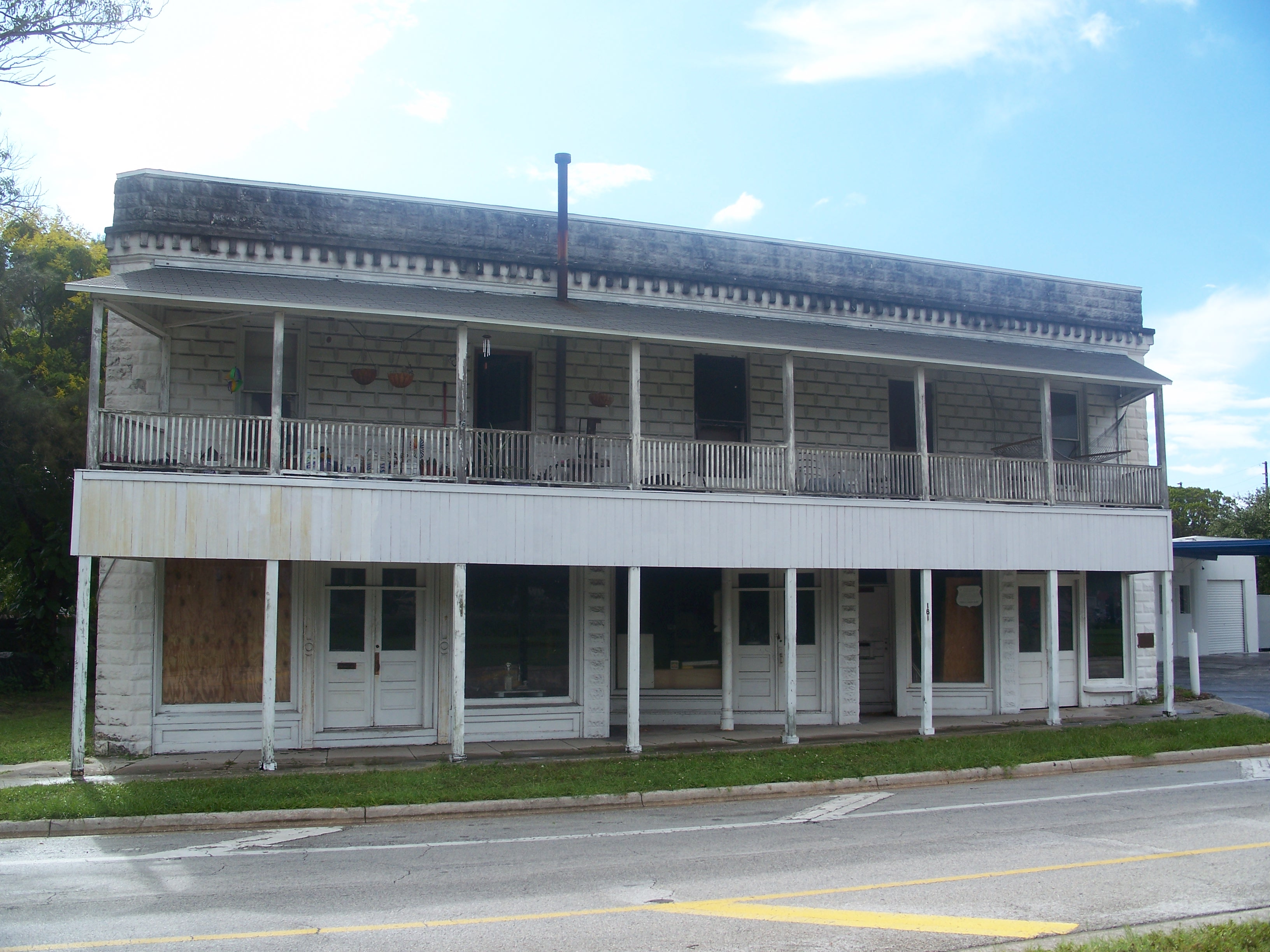

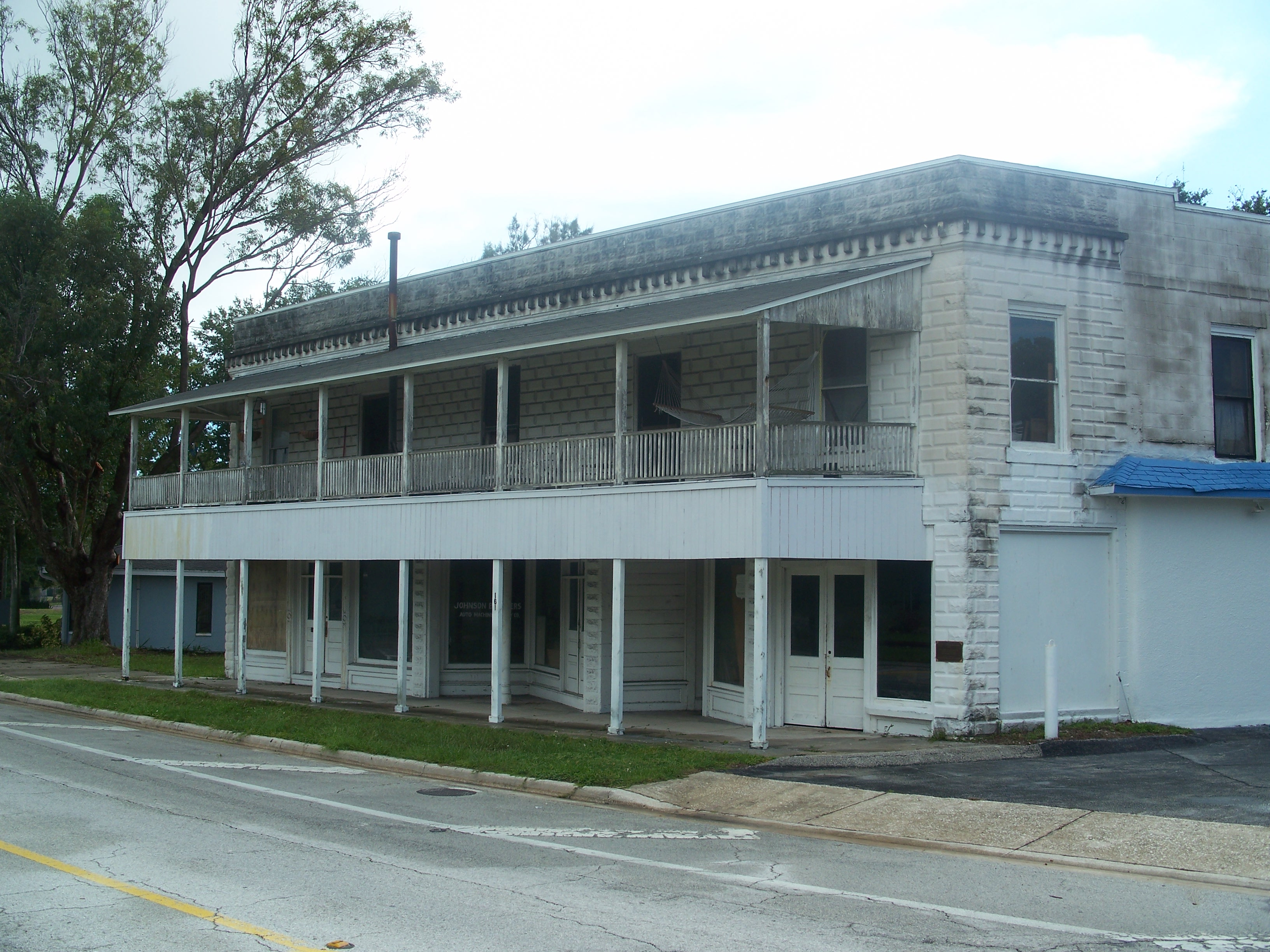

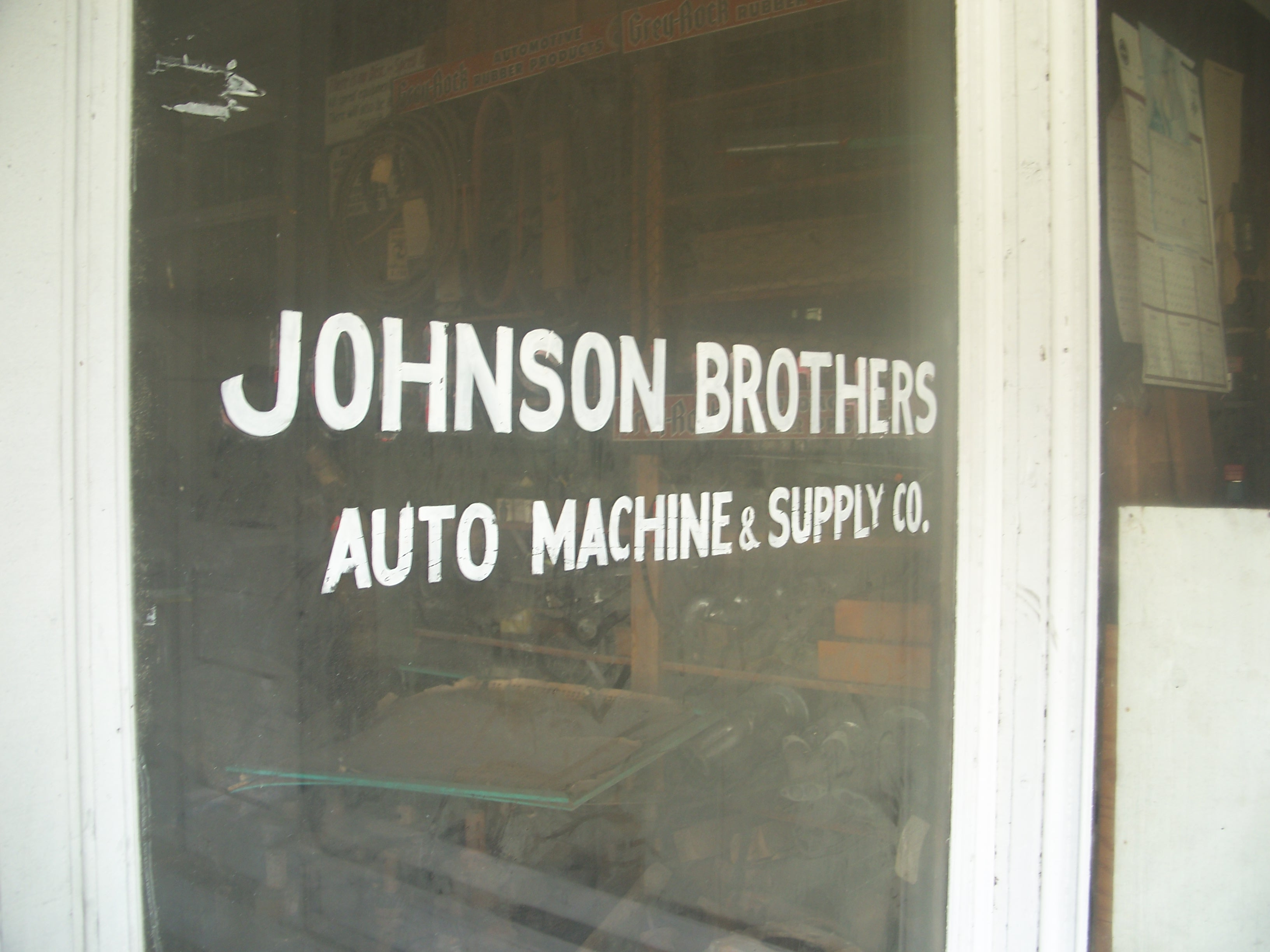

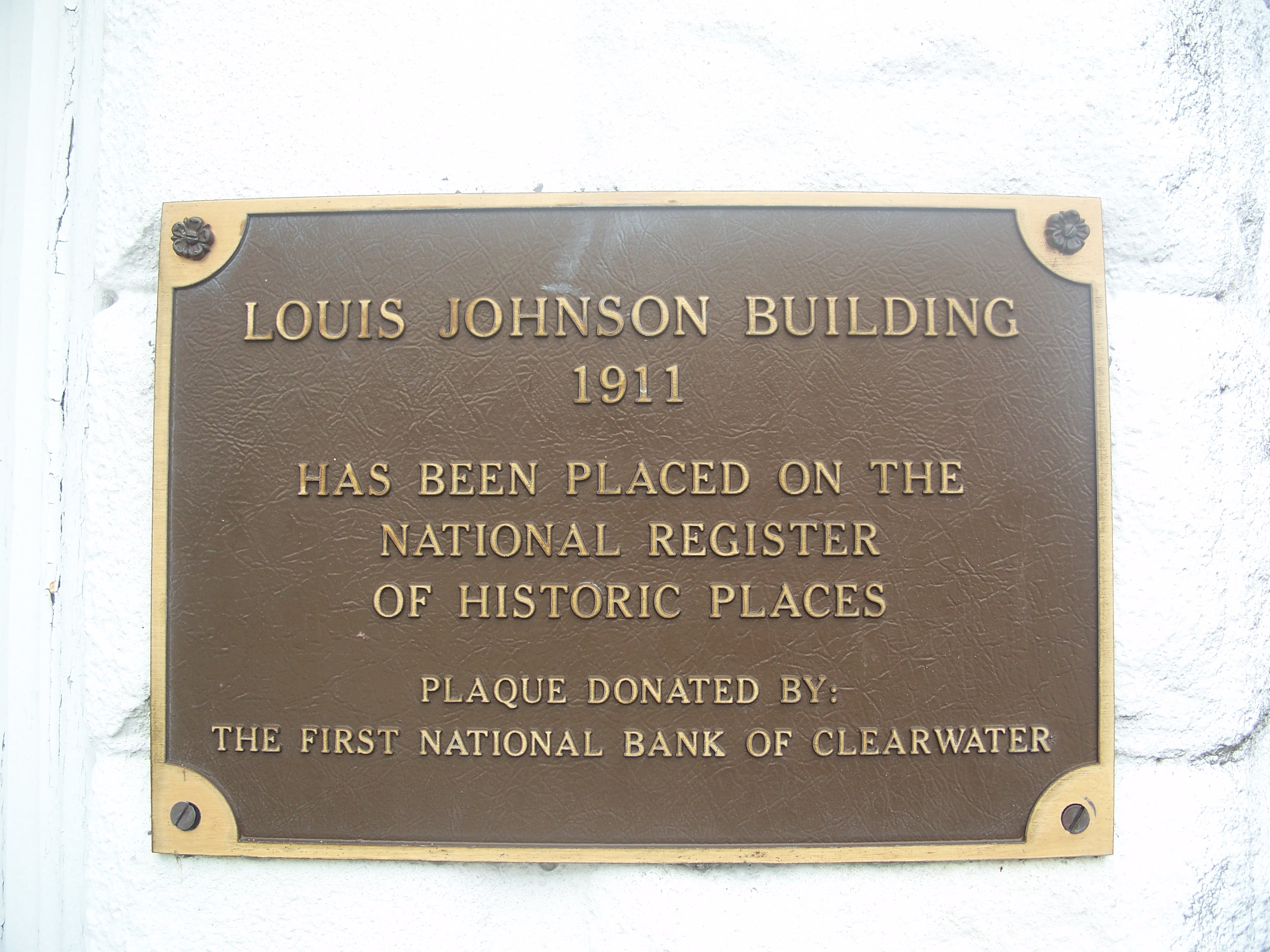
Historical marker
