= South Ward School (Clearwater, Florida) =

- U.S. National Register of Historic Places
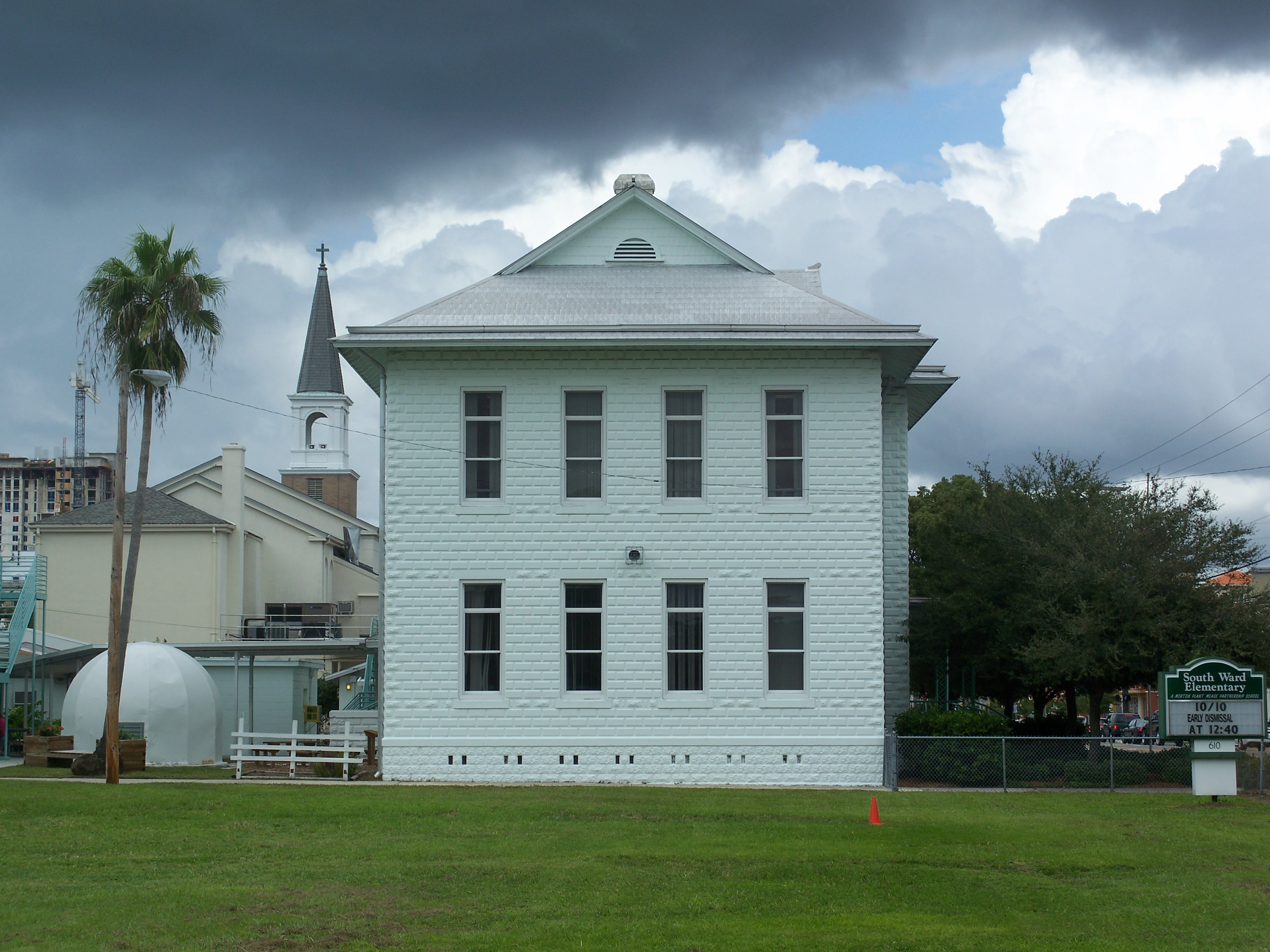

- Location within Florida Location within the United States
- Location: Clearwater, Florida
- Coordinates: 27°57′29″N 82°48′2″W
- NRHP reference No.: 79000690
- Added to NRHP: June 18, 1979

The South Ward School is an historic building in Clearwater, Florida. It is located at 610 South Fort Harrison Avenue. On June 18, 1979, it was added to the U.S. National Register of Historic Places. It is now the home to the Clearwater Historical Society Museum and Cultural Center.
