= Green-Richman Arcade =

- U.S. National Register of Historic Places
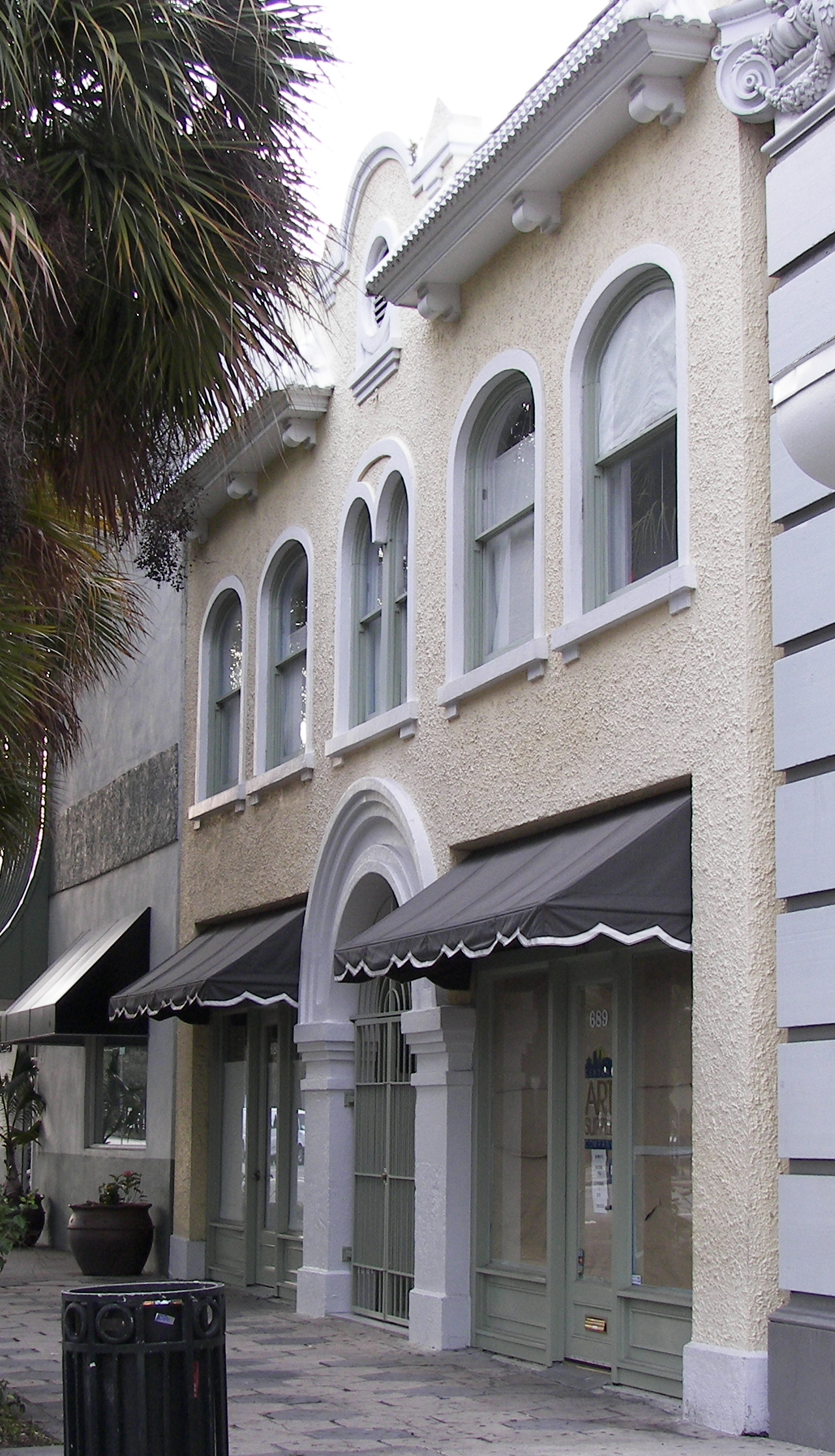

- Location within Florida Location within the United States
- Location: St. Petersburg, Florida
- Coordinates: 27°46′17″N 82°38′36.75″W
- NRHP reference No.: 98000027
- Added to NRHP: January 30, 1998

The Green-Richman Arcade (also known as the Parsley and Stone Arcade) is a historic site in St. Petersburg, Florida. It is located at 689 Central Avenue. On January 30, 1998, it was added to the U.S. National Register of Historic Places.
