= Domestic Science and Manual Training School =

- U.S. National Register of Historic Places
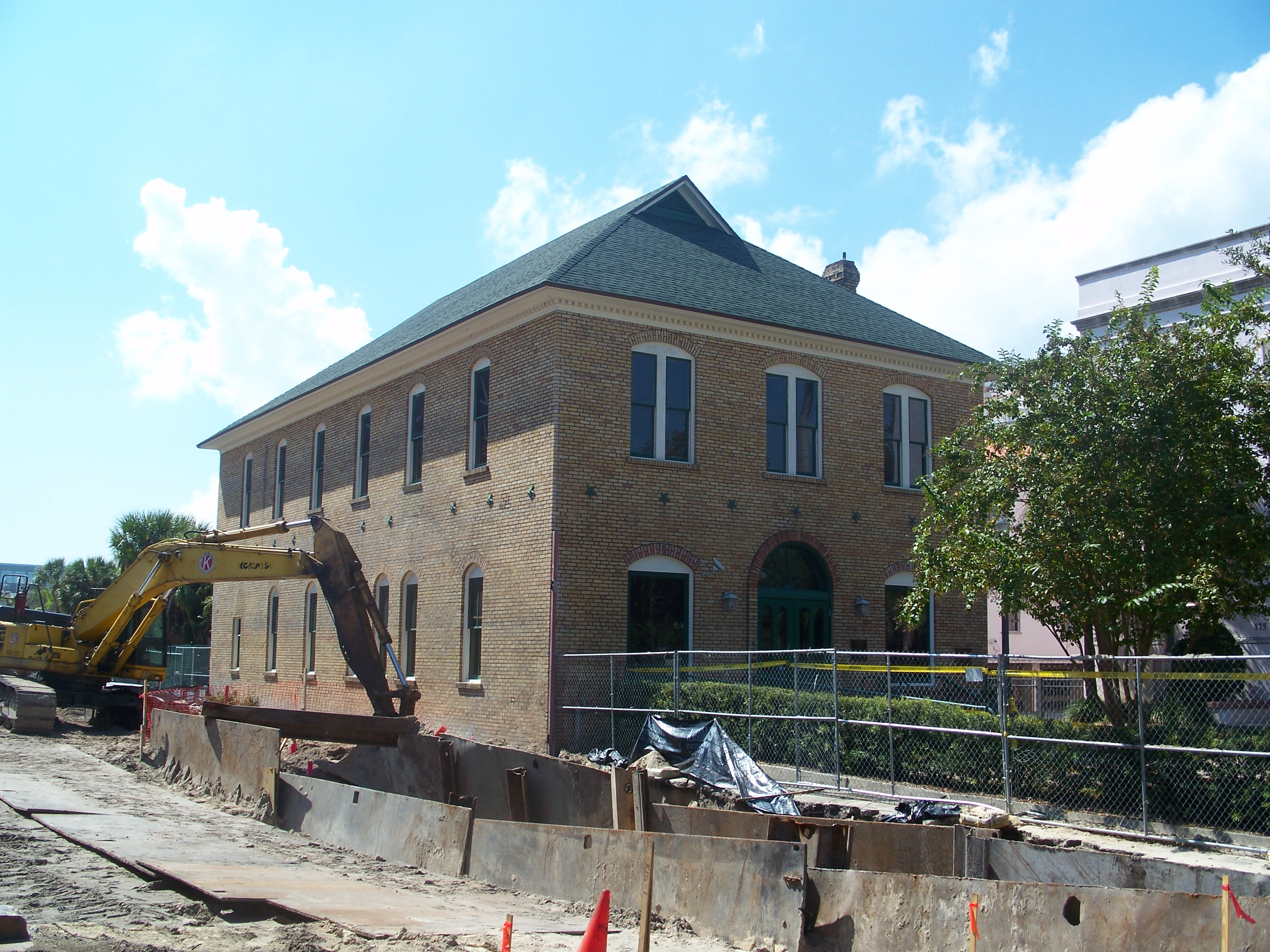

- Location within Florida Location within the United States
- Location: St. Petersburg, Florida
- Coordinates: 27°46′23″N 82°38′21″W
- NRHP reference No.: 99001250
- Added to NRHP: October 14, 1999

The Domestic Science and Manual Training School (also known as the St. Petersburg City Hall Annex) is an historic school in St. Petersburg, Florida. It is located at 440-442 2nd Avenue North. On October 14, 1999, it was added to the U.S. National Register of Historic Places.
