= Dennis Hotel =

- U.S. National Register of Historic Places
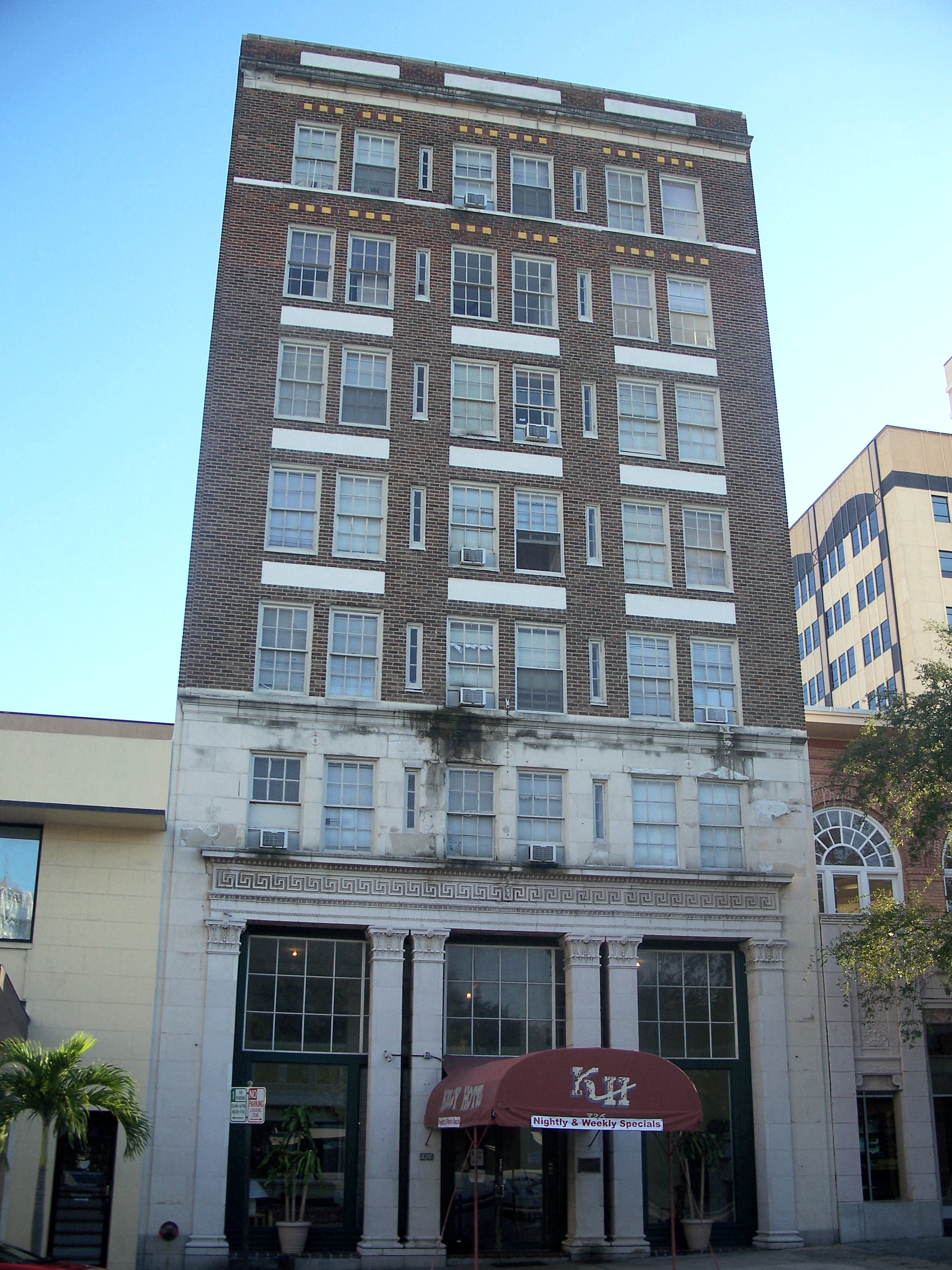

- Location within Florida Location within the United States
- Location: St. Petersburg, Florida
- Coordinates: 27°46′18.67166″N 82°38′15.70322″W
- Architectural style: Beaux-arts
- NRHP reference No.: 86000804
- Added to NRHP: April 17, 1986

The Dennis Hotel (also known as the McCarthy Hotel) is a historic hotel in St. Petersburg, Florida. It is located at 326 1st Avenue North. On April 17, 1986, it was added to the U.S. National Register of Historic Places.
