= Downtown St. Petersburg Historic District =

Historic district in Florida, United States

- U.S. National Register of Historic Places
- U.S. Historic district
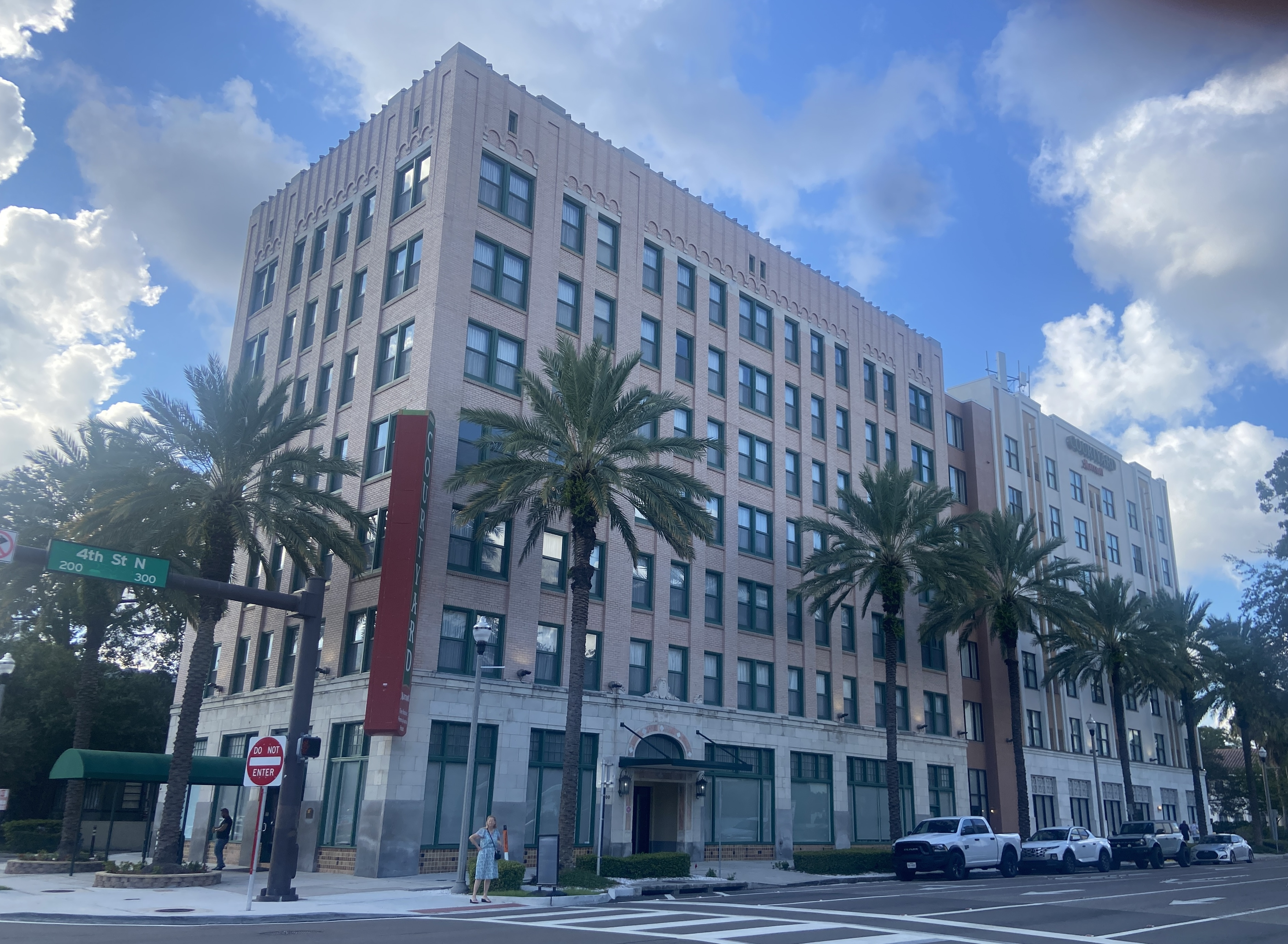
- The former Pennsylvania Hotel, a contributing property to the district

- Location within Florida Location within the United States
- Location: St. Petersburg, Florida
- Coordinates: 27°46′34″N 82°38′19″W
- Area: 420 acres (1.7 km^{2})
- NRHP reference No.: 04000364
- Added to NRHP: April 30, 2004

The Downtown St. Petersburg Historic District is a U.S. historic district (designated as such on April 30, 2004) located in St. Petersburg, Florida. The district is bounded by 5th Avenue N, Beach Drive NE, Central Avenue, and 9th Street N. It contains 367 historic buildings and 7 objects.

== Gallery ==
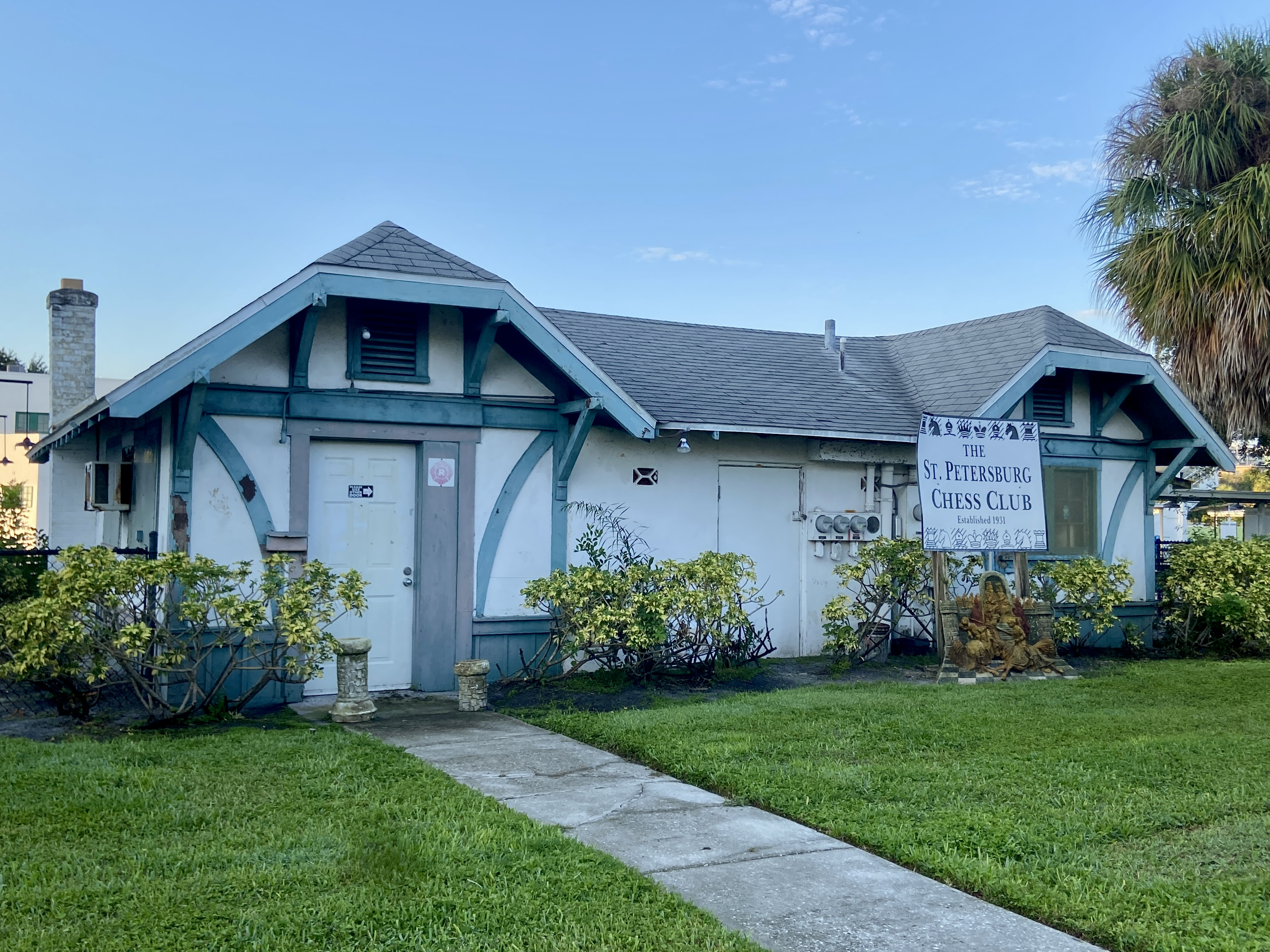
St. Petersburg Chess Clubhouse

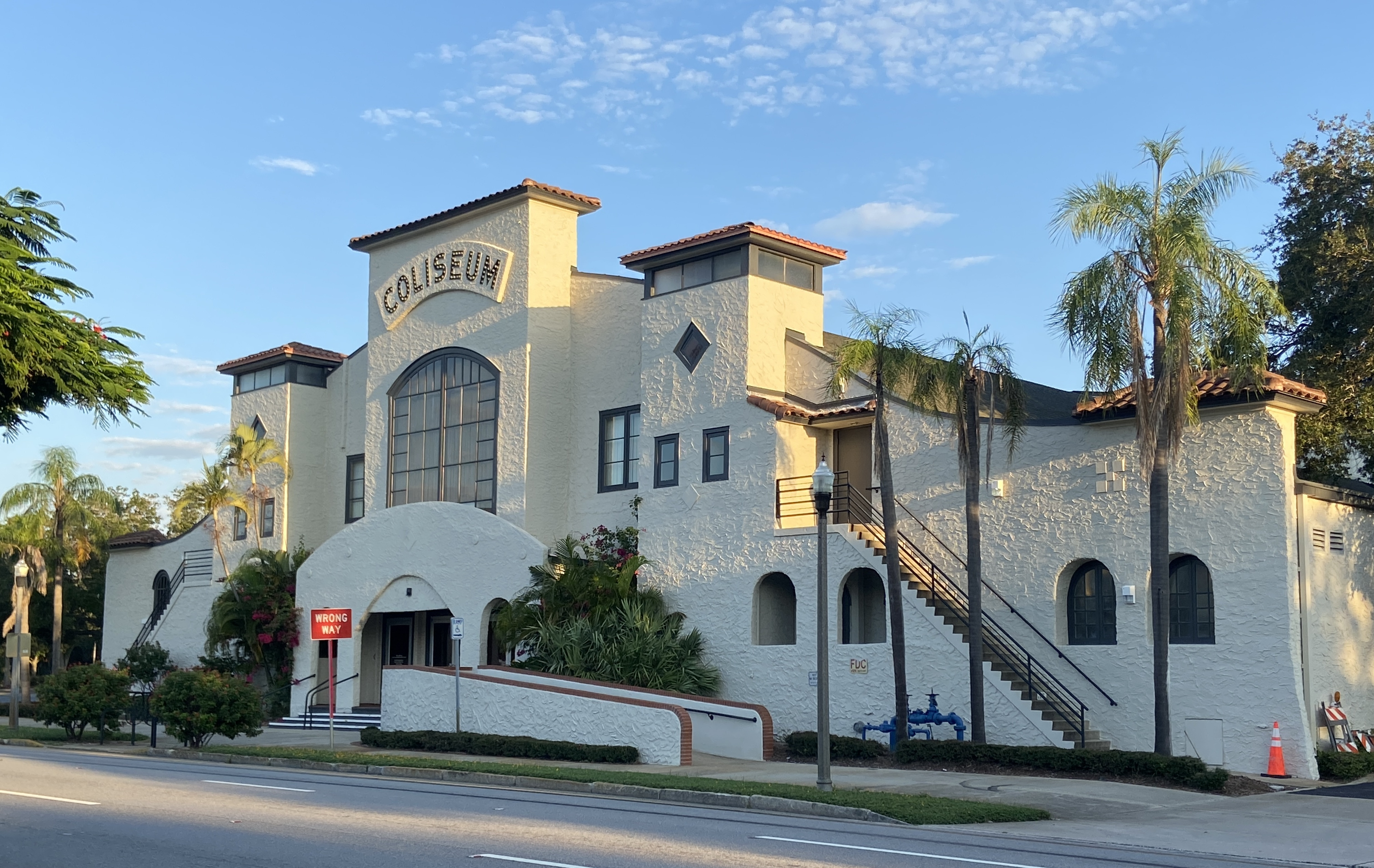
St. Petersburg Coliseum

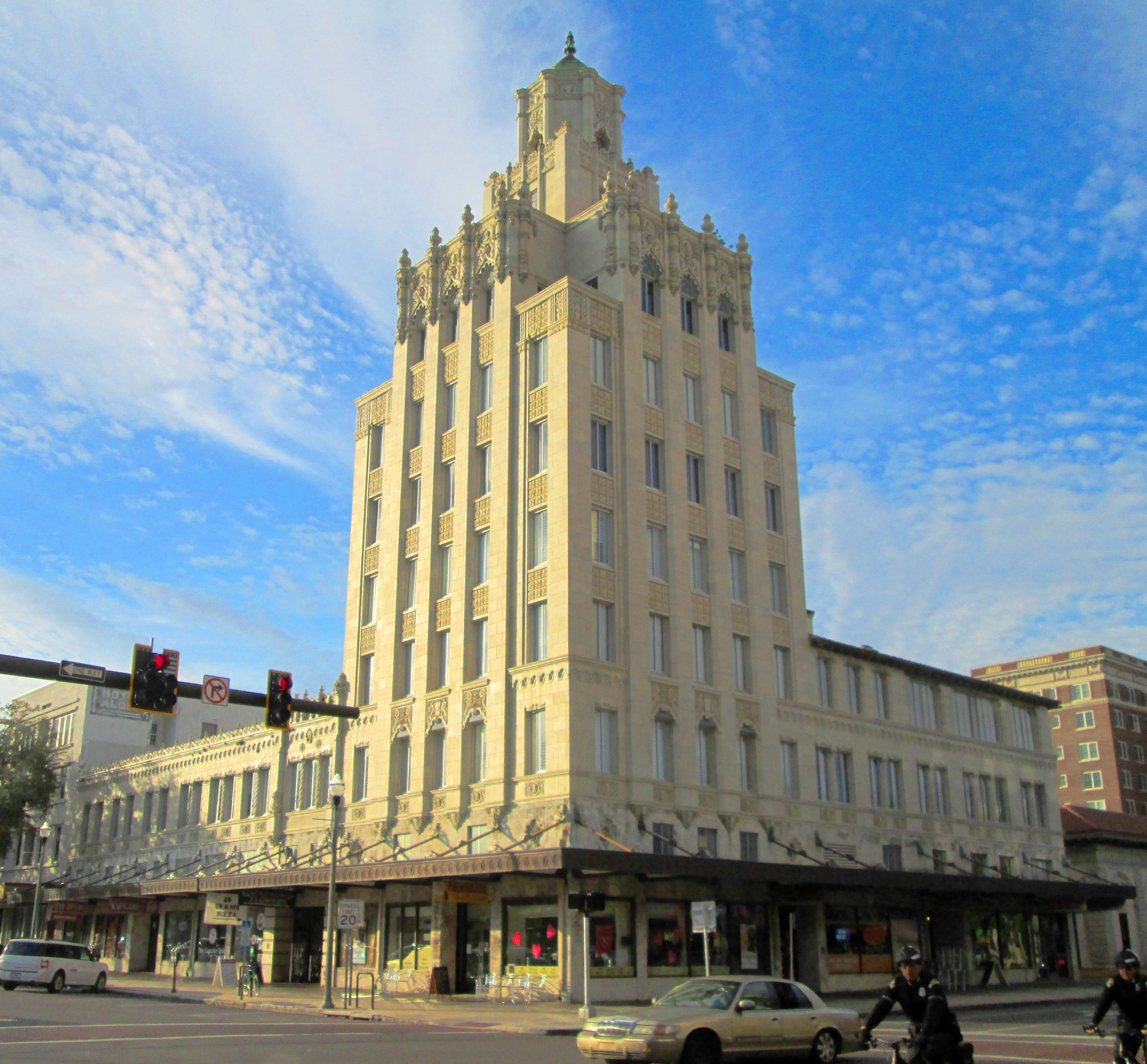
Snell Arcade

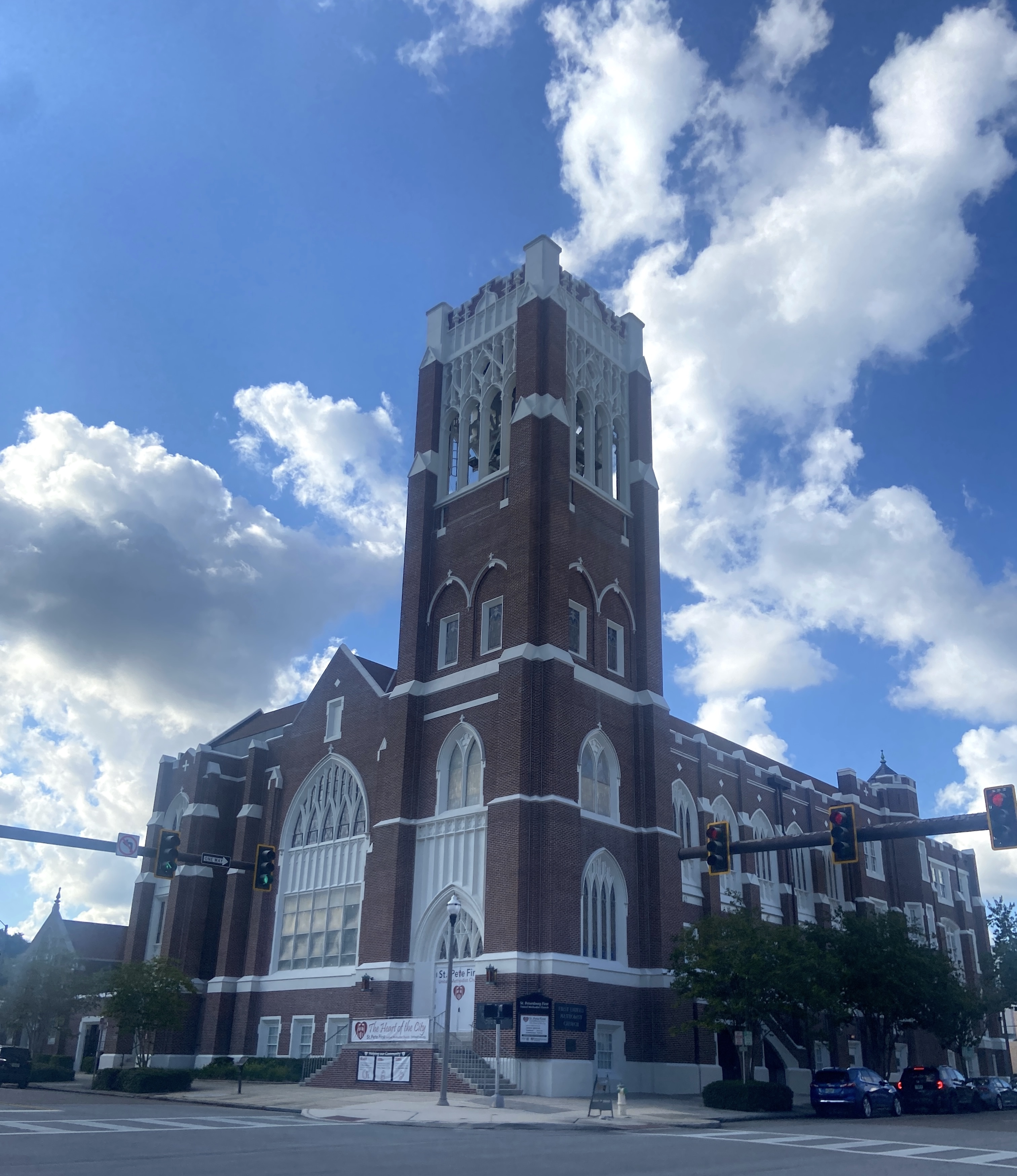
First United Methodist Church

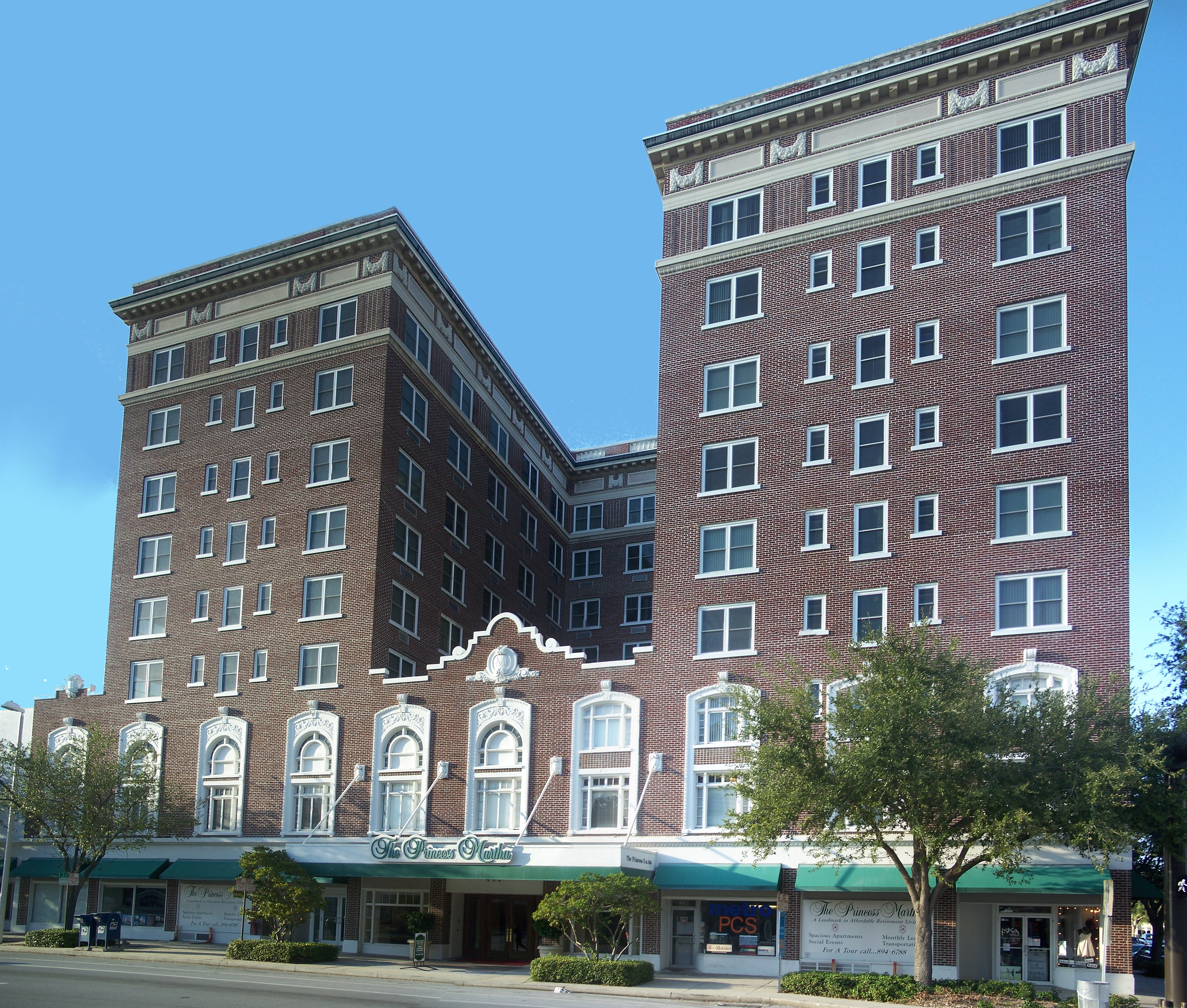
Princess Martha Hotel

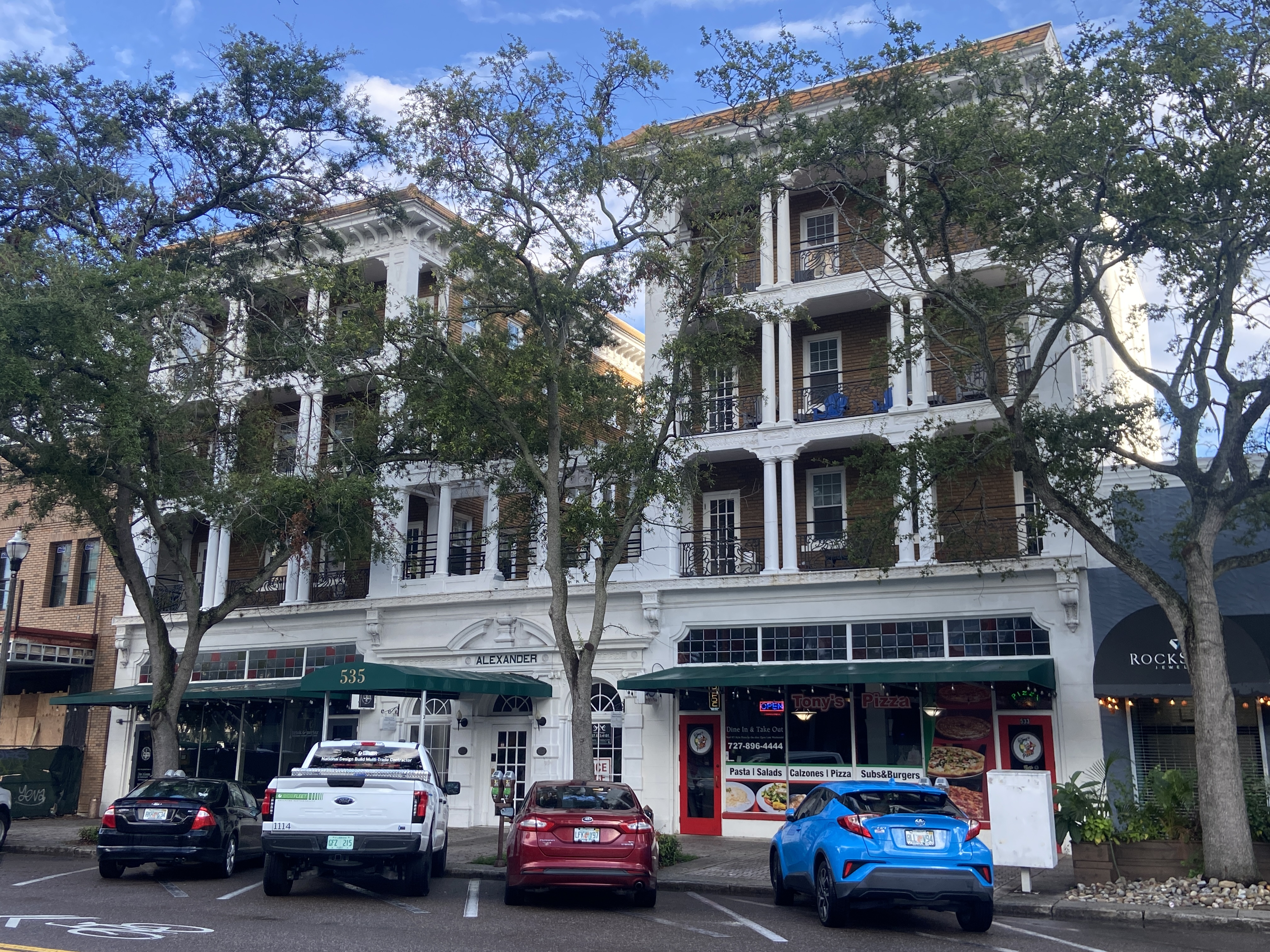
Alexander Hotel

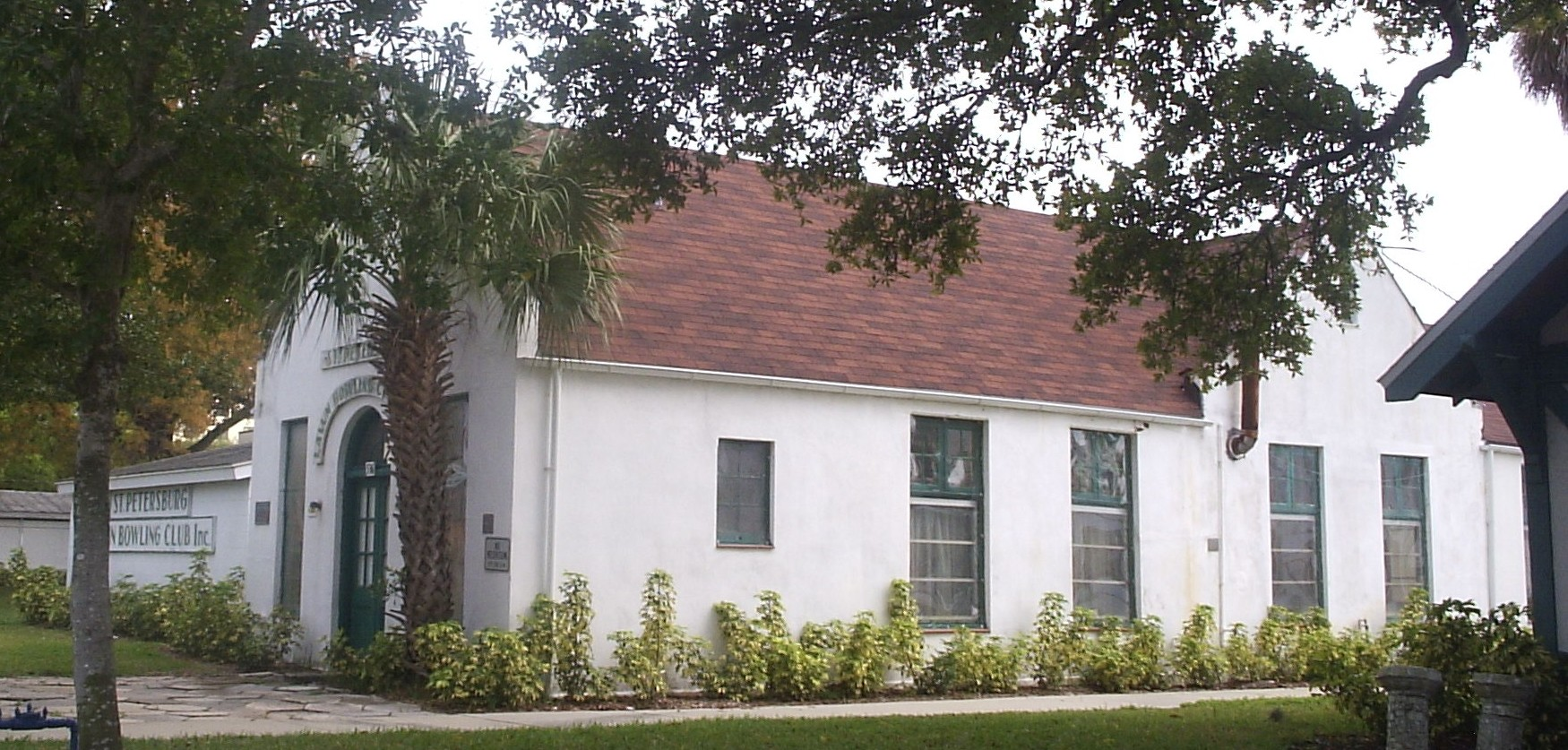
St Petersburg Lawn Bowling Clubhouse
