= Dunedin History Museum =

Local history museum in Dunedin, Florida, United States

Coordinates: 28°00′42″N 82°47′20″W

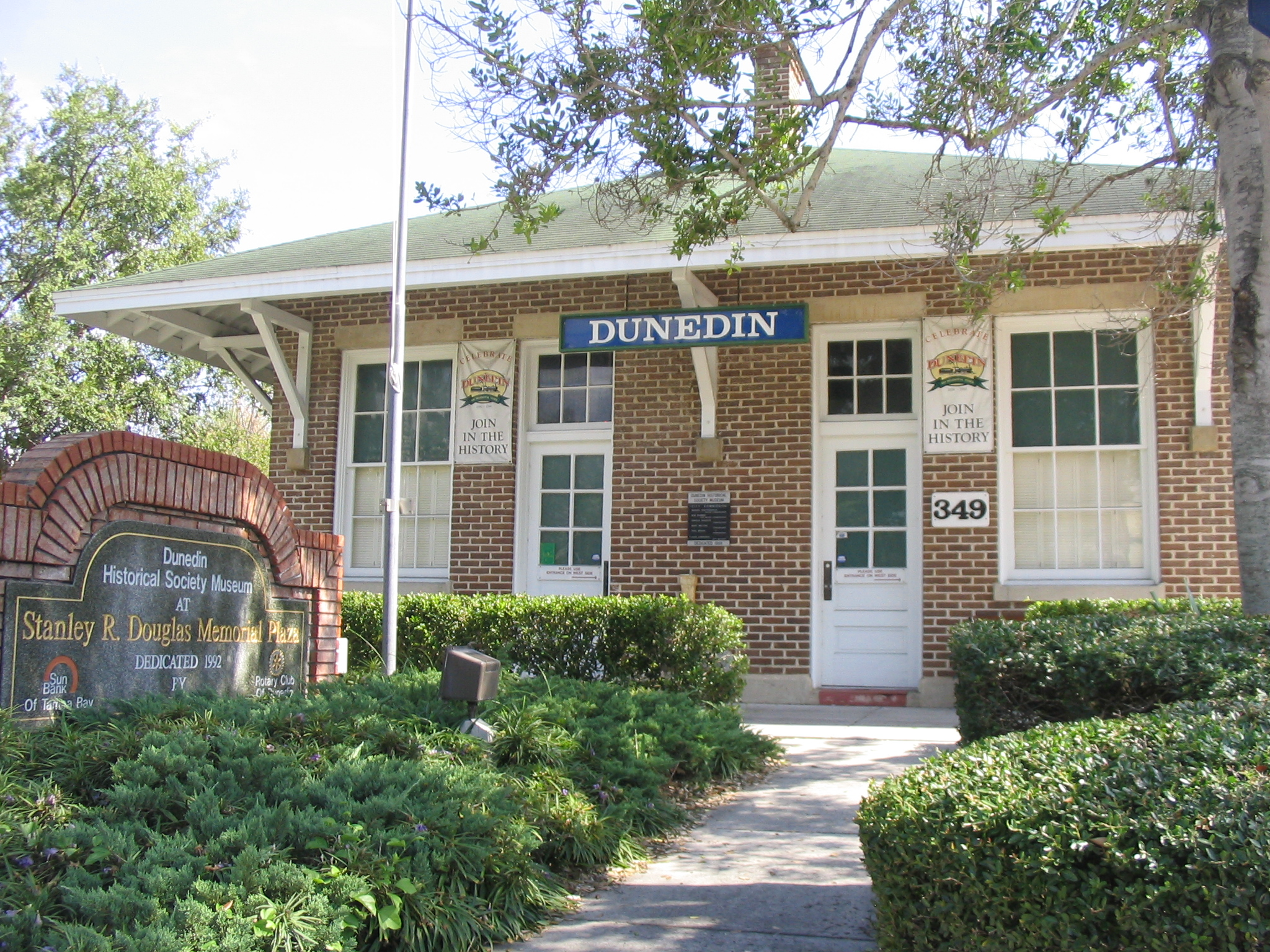
Dunedin History Museum

The Dunedin History Museum is a local history museum located in downtown Dunedin in the U.S. state of Florida. Founded in 1970, the museum is housed in a former railroad depot built by the Atlantic Coast Line Railroad in 1924. The former rail line that serviced the depot, originally built by the Orange Belt Railway in 1888 and last used for a series of special excursion trips from nearby Tarpon Springs and back on March 8, 1987, was converted into a section of the Pinellas Trail in the 1990s. The museum contains more than 2,000 artifacts, 2,500 photographs, and a library of books that convey a great deal of information on Dunedin's past. The museum provides special programming for schools and summer camps as well as a rotating special exhibit gallery.

The Dunedin History Museum is host to the Dunedin Times Historical Archive. The museum has a complete collection of the Dunedin Times from 1924 to 1966, the year that the paper stopped being reliably printed.

== Renovation and Expansion ==
=== 2018 ===
The museum underwent an expansive renovation and remodel from 2017 to 2018 which included new exhibits and a new entryway. Director Vinnie Luisi and curator David Knupp worked with fabricators to create a modern and interactive museum experience that explores Dunedin's history through mixed media platforms.

=== 2019 ===
The museum opened a special exhibit, Jagged Lines: America's Tattoo Tradition, in June 2019 which explored the history of tattooing in North America. The exhibit remained open to the public until December 2020.

=== 2020 ===
Separating fact from fiction, Dunedin's pirate exhibit, A Short Life and a Merry One, featured an in-depth history of pirate history as well as modern day pirate myths that are pervasive in pop culture.

=== 2021 ===
Coinciding with the 100th anniversary of the Tampa Bay Hurricane, the museum opened the exhibit A Century of Storms that looked at the last one hundred years of hurricane history in Florida.

=== 2022 ===
The museum opened the special exhibit Florida Floodways in February 2022 which examined Florida's food history along with related cultural, economic, and historical issues. The exhibit will run until 2023.

== Permanent Collection ==
The permanent collection features many items focused on local history. These items include antique clothing, household tools, and utensils, all used by pioneer families of Dunedin during the late 1800s and 1900s. The collection focused on city history features original materials from the Dunedin Post Office, the first Dunedin band, and several other major companies from the Dunedin area.

As the museum is built in a former railroad depot, the museum's collection includes railroad materials. These materials include pictures and information on the Florida railroad, railroad equipment, telegraph material, and original material from the Dunedin Railroad station. This collection highlights the evolution of the railroad companies, which flourished locally and state-wide.

Other permanent portions of the museum's collection focus on regional topics on Dunedin, including its multicultural origins, pioneering families, Mease Hospital, sports history, industries, and natural habitats.

== Past exhibits ==
May 2015, Victorious: Dunedin, Pinellas County, and World War II

June 2014, Comics: The Superpowered History

January 2013, The Smithsonian Institution's Journey Stories

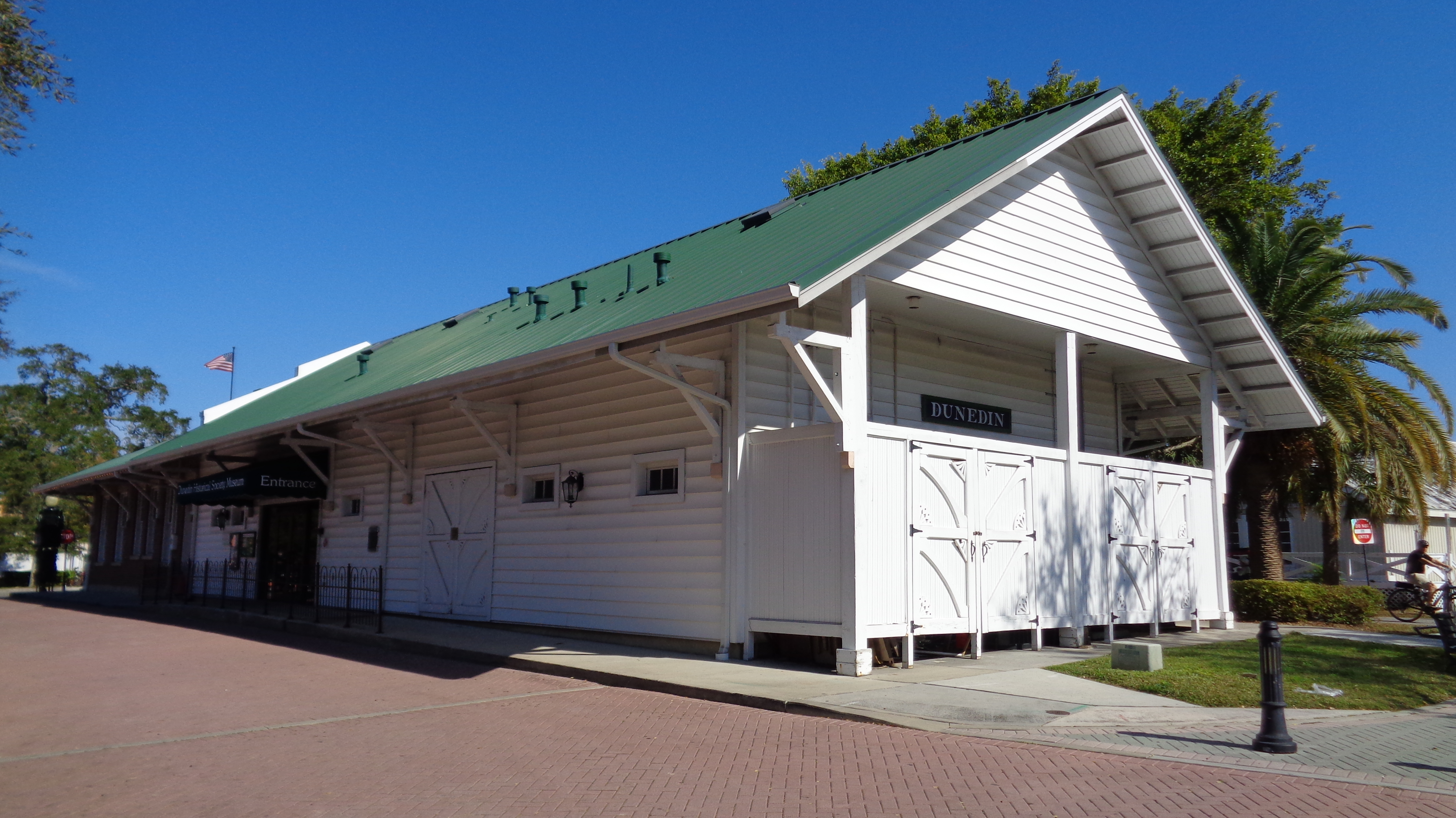
Back of the depot building.

== Partnerships ==
Dunedin History Museum has close-knit involvement with the community, especially with the Dunedin Public Library, just a mile down the road. The library houses a designated area for two exhibits: one for the Dunedin Historical Museum and one for the Armed Forces History Museum.

It is also partnered with the San Jose Catholic Church and local K-12 schools.

== Education ==
The Dunedin Museum offers History Kits from prior exhibits for schools to borrow. These kits contain photographs, artifacts, and curriculum materials. Their outreach programs feature lectures and living history programs for competition in the classroom at an educator's request. Additionally, a Teachers Guidebook on Dunedin History is also available for elementary schools upon request.

== Library ==
The library is located on the second floor of the museum's building. The library provides patrons and other community members with over 200 volumes of cultural and historical information about Dunedin, Pinellas County, and Florida.

== Accessibility ==
All ADA requirements have been completed at the museum by the City of Dunedin. The museum focuses on providing accessibility for many different community segments, including minorities and people with special needs, to learn about Dunedin and Florida history and enjoy what the museum offers.

== See also ==
- St. Petersburg station (Amtrak)
- Tarpon Springs Depot

| Preceding station | Atlantic Coast Line Railroad | Following station |
|---|---|---|
| Clearwater toward St. Petersburg | Orange Belt Railway | Ozona toward Sanford |

== Bibliography ==
- Luisi, Vincent (2010), Railroading in Pinellas County (1st ed.), Arcadia Publishing, ISBN 978-0-7385-8550-5
