= Rankmark =

Golf equipment company

- Industry: Golf
- Founder: Charlie Mandel
- Headquarters: Tarpon Springs, United States
- Area served: Worldwide
- Services: Golf Club Testing
- Website: www.rankmark.com

Rankmark is a golf equipment testing company based in Tarpon Springs, Florida, United States. The company was founded by Charlie Mandel in 1998. Rankmark's golf clubs tests include high and low handicap golfers. They publish results of golf tests on rankmark.com Rankmark accepts advertising from golf club manufacturers, or any company that wants to reach golfers.

== Media coverage ==
Rankmark has received coverage in the following publications:

Golf Magazine

The St. Petersburg Times

Florida Golf Central

Daily Pilot
