= Tarpon Springs Sponge Boats MPS =

- Tarpon Springs MPS
- U.S. National Register of Historic Places
- Location within Florida Location within the United States
- Location: Tarpon Springs, Florida
- Coordinates: 28°8′55″N 82°45′29″W
- MPS: Tarpon Springs Sponge Boats
- NRHP reference No.: 64500126

The following buildings were added to the National Register of Historic Places as part of the Tarpon Springs Sponge Boats Multiple Property Submission (or MPS).

Resource Name	Also known as	Address	City	County	Added
Duchess (Sponge Hooking Boat)		Tarpon Springs Sponge Docks at Dodecanese Boulevard	Tarpon Springs	Pinellas County	August 2, 1990
George N. Cretekos (Sponge Diving Boat)		Tarpon Springs Sponge Docks at Dodecanese Boulevard	Tarpon Springs	Pinellas County	August 3, 1990
N.K. Symi (Sponge Diving Boat)		Tarpon Springs Sponge Docks at Dodecanese Boulevard	Tarpon Springs	Pinellas County	August 2, 1990
St. Nicholas III (Sponge Diving Boat)		Tarpon Springs Sponge Docks at Dodecanese Boulevard	Tarpon Springs	Pinellas County	August 3, 1990
St. Nicholas VI (Sponge Diving Boat)		Tarpon Springs Sponge Docks at Dodecanese Boulevard	Tarpon Springs	Pinellas County	August 3, 1990
