= N. K. Symi =

Historic vessel at Tarpon Springs, Florida

- U.S. National Register of Historic Places
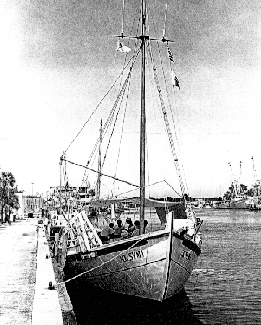

- Location within Florida Location within the United States
- Location: Tarpon Springs, Florida
- Coordinates: 28°09′21″N 82°45′32″W
- MPS: Tarpon Springs Sponge Boats MPS
- NRHP reference No.: 90001132
- Added to NRHP: August 2, 1990

The N. K. Symi (also known as the Eleni) is a historic boat in Tarpon Springs, Florida. It is located at the Tarpon Springs Sponge Docks at Dodecanese Boulevard. On August 2, 1990, it was added to the U.S. National Register of Historic Places.
