= Tarpon Springs Greektown Historic District =

Historic district in Florida, United States

- U.S. National Register of Historic Places
- U.S. Historic district
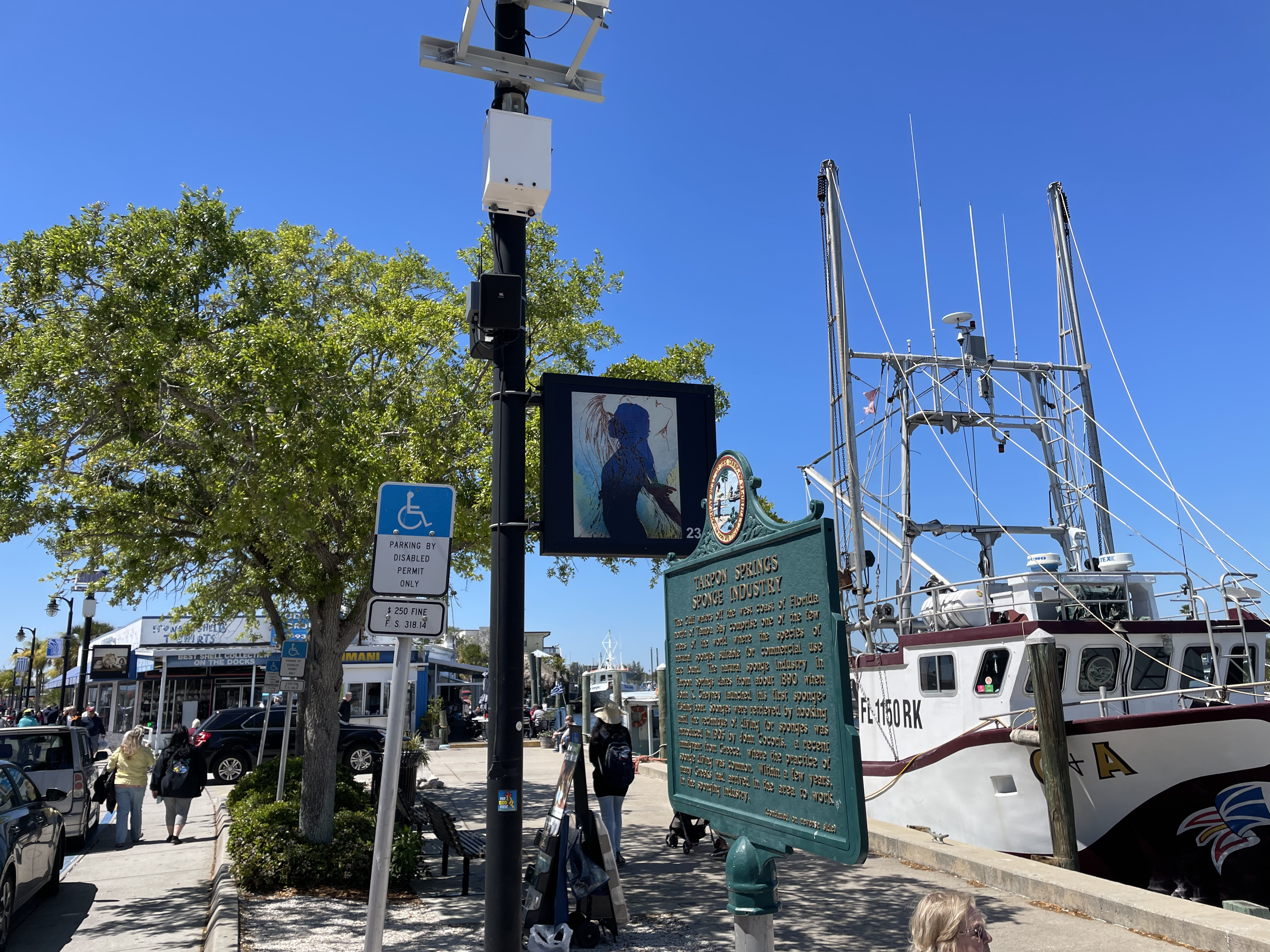

- Location within Florida Location within the United States
- Location: Tarpon Springs, Florida
- Coordinates: 28.155607°N 82.760875°W
- NRHP reference No.: 14000321
- Added to NRHP: June 2, 2014

Located in north Pinellas County, Florida, approximately thirty miles northwest of Tampa, Tarpon Springs Greektown Historic District is a U.S. historic district. It was added to the National Register of Historic Places on June 2, 2014.

Tarpon Springs’ Greektown District is a traditional cultural property that preserves a strong ethnic and maritime character. The District measures about 140 acres. The primary area is bounded by the Anclote River on the north, Tarpon Avenue and Spring Bayou on the south, Hibiscus and Pinellas Streets on the east; and Roosevelt and Grand Boulevards to Spring Bayou on the west—see the maps and inventory for details. The architectural resources have historic integrity. They convey a distinctive sense of place and ethnic heritage, with commercial, industrial, residential, and religion-based buildings as well as boats, generally developed without the benefit of architectural plans.

The Greektown District was the first Traditional Cultural Property listed in the State of Florida.

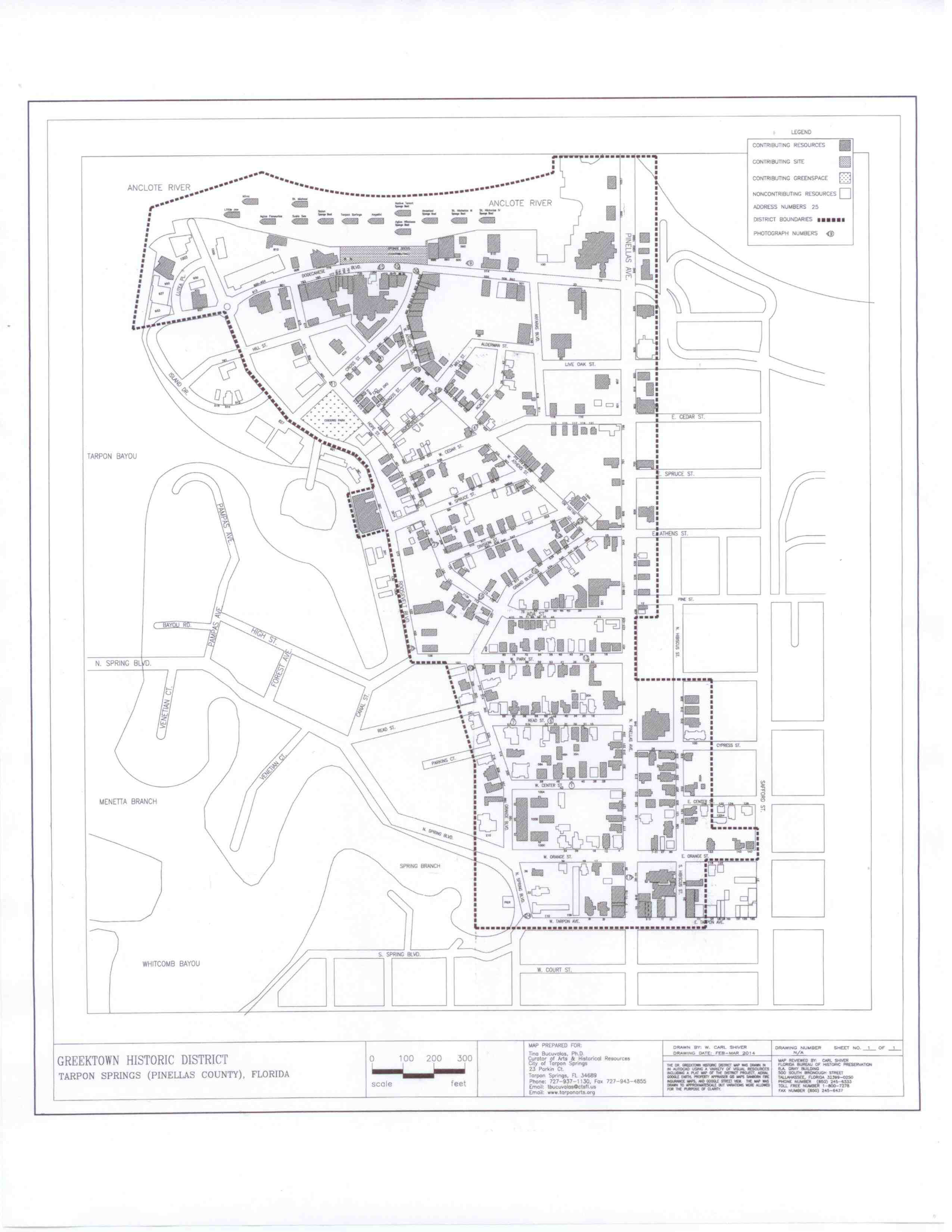
Greektown Historic District map
