= Old Tarpon Springs High School =

- Old Tarpon Springs High School,
- U.S. National Register of Historic Places
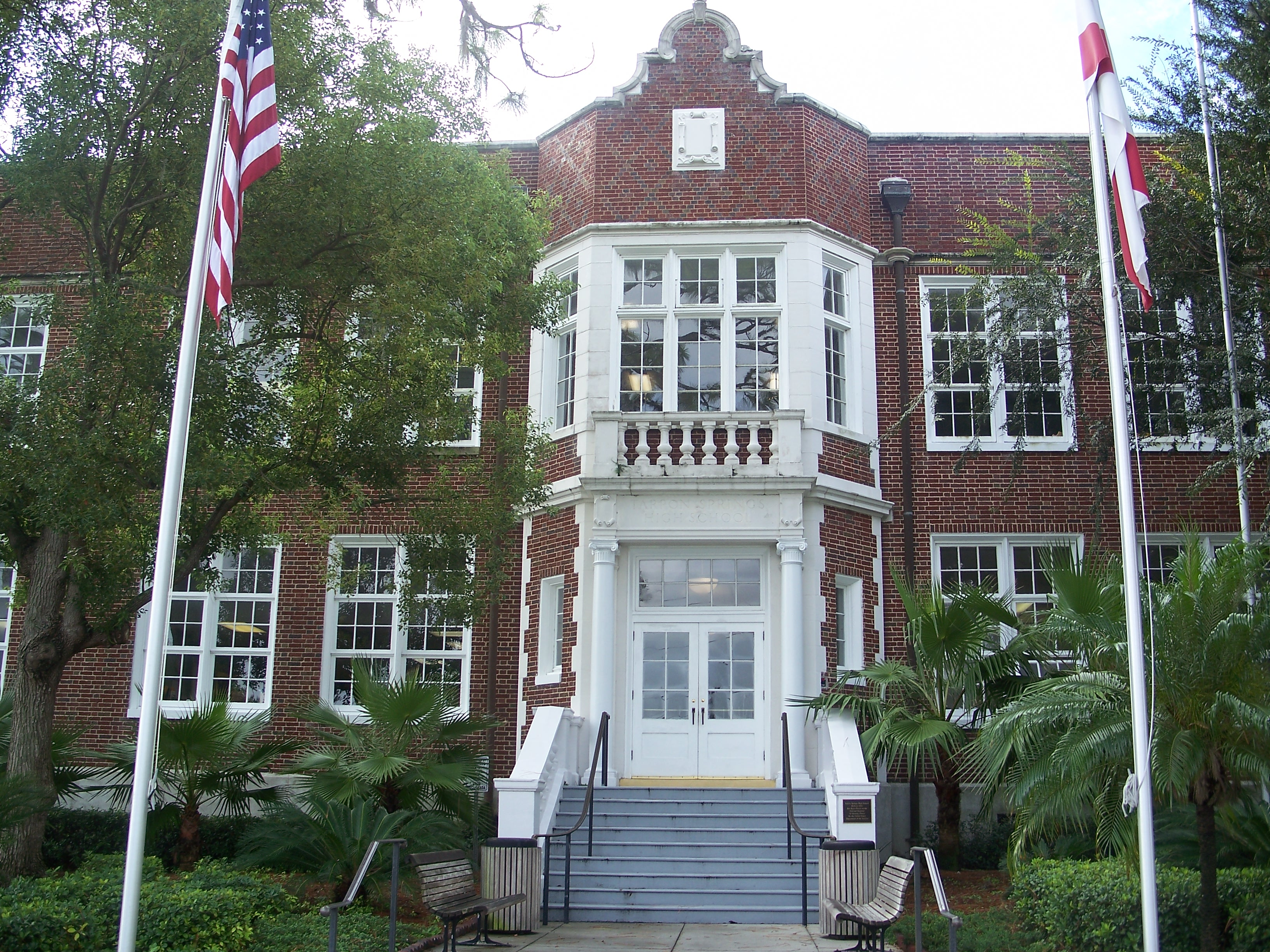

- Location within Florida Location within the United States
- Location: Tarpon Springs, Florida
- Coordinates: 28°09′02″N 82°45′11″W
- Built: 1925
- Architect: Emmitt Hull
- Architectural style: Mediterranean Revival elements, Beaux-Arts-style central entrance
- NRHP reference No.: 90001538
- Added to NRHP: October 11, 1990

Old Tarpon Springs High School (also known as the Tarpon Springs City Hall) is a historic school building in Tarpon Springs, in the United States state of Florida. It is located at 324 East Pine Street. On October 11, 1990, it was added to the National Register of Historic Places.
