= Elaine Esposito =

American coma patient (1934–1978)

- Born: December 3, 1934; Alabama, United States
- Died: November 25, 1978 (aged 43); Tarpon Springs, Florida
- Known for: Longest period of human unconsciousness
- Parents: Fernando ("Louie") Esposito (father); Lucy Esposito (mother)

Elaine Esposito (December 3, 1934 – November 25, 1978) held the record for the longest period of time in a coma according to Guinness World Records, having lost consciousness in 1941 and eventually dying in that condition more than 37 years later. Edwarda O'Bara and Aruna Shanbaug later exceeded Esposito's record of having been in the longest comas.

== History ==
Elaine was the only child of Louis and Lucy Esposito of Chicago, Illinois. At age six she was taken to a hospital having suffered a ruptured appendix, where she underwent an appendectomy on August 6, 1941. She never awoke after being anesthetized. As the surgery was coming to an end, she went into convulsions, her temperature rose to 107.6 °F (42.0 °C), and doctors feared that she would not survive the night. The cause of the complication was debated, with some suggesting that Elaine had encephalitis, and others saying that her brain was not receiving enough oxygen during the operation.

The first ten months of her coma were spent in a Chicago hospital until her parents could no longer afford her care, at which point they took her home so her mother Lucy could care for her day and night. In her lengthy coma, she showed states of both deep sleep and open-eyed unconsciousness and she grew slightly to 85 pounds (39 kg). Elaine survived numerous other conditions over the years, including additional abdominal surgery, pneumonia, the measles, and a collapsed lung. The family eventually moved to Tarpon Springs, Florida, and she was also taken to visit the Grotto at Lourdes, France, where her parents hoped for a miracle. Her father, Louis, who had been working multiple jobs, died from cancer in January 1978. Elaine died later that year at the age of 43 years and 357 days, having been in a coma for 37 years and 111 days.

Esposito's story was brought back into attention in the late 1990s and early 2000s in the controversy surrounding the case of Terri Schiavo, who was in a persistent vegetative state. Coincidentally, Schiavo and Esposito were both being cared for in Pinellas County, Florida, at the time of their deaths, and they shared a birthday, December 3.
