= Tarpon Springs Historic District =

Historic district in Florida, United States

- U.S. National Register of Historic Places
- U.S. Historic district
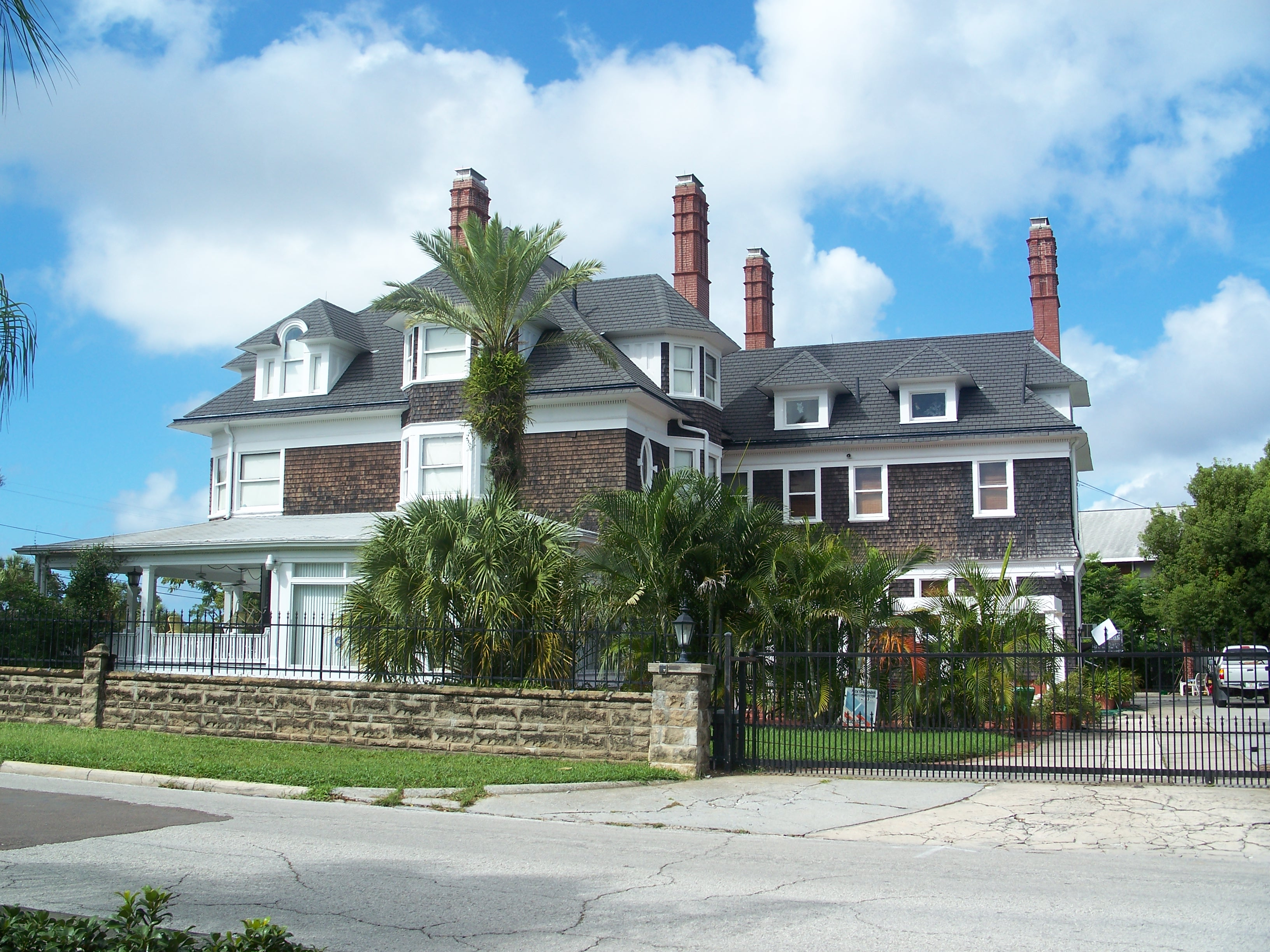
- House in the district

- Location within Florida Location within the United States
- Location: Tarpon Springs, Florida
- Coordinates: 28°8′46.2″N 82°45′21.7″W
- Area: 700 acres (2.8 km^{2})
- NRHP reference No.: 90001762
- Added to NRHP: December 6, 1990

The Tarpon Springs Historic District is a U.S. historic district in Tarpon Springs, Florida. It is bounded by Read Street, Hibiscus Street, Orange Street, Levis Avenue, Lemon Street and Spring Bayou, encompasses approximately 700 acres (2.8 km^{2}), and contains 145 historic buildings. On December 6, 1990, it was added to the U.S. National Register of Historic Places.

== See also ==
- Tarpon Springs Depot
