= St. Nicholas Greek Orthodox Cathedral (Tarpon Springs, Florida) =

Church building in Florida, USA

Coordinates: 28.1472°N 82.7567°W

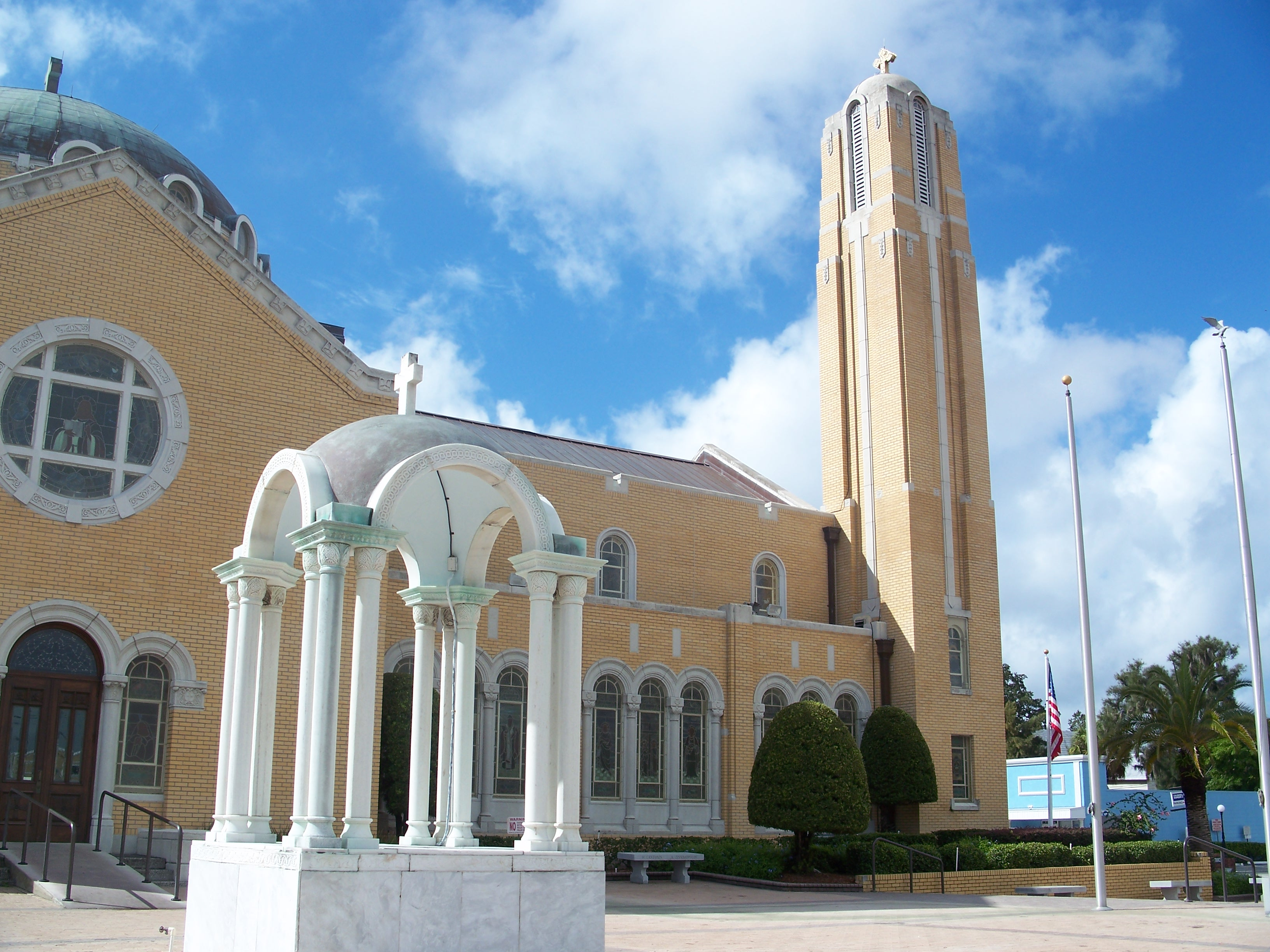
St. Nicholas Orthodox Church; the belfry

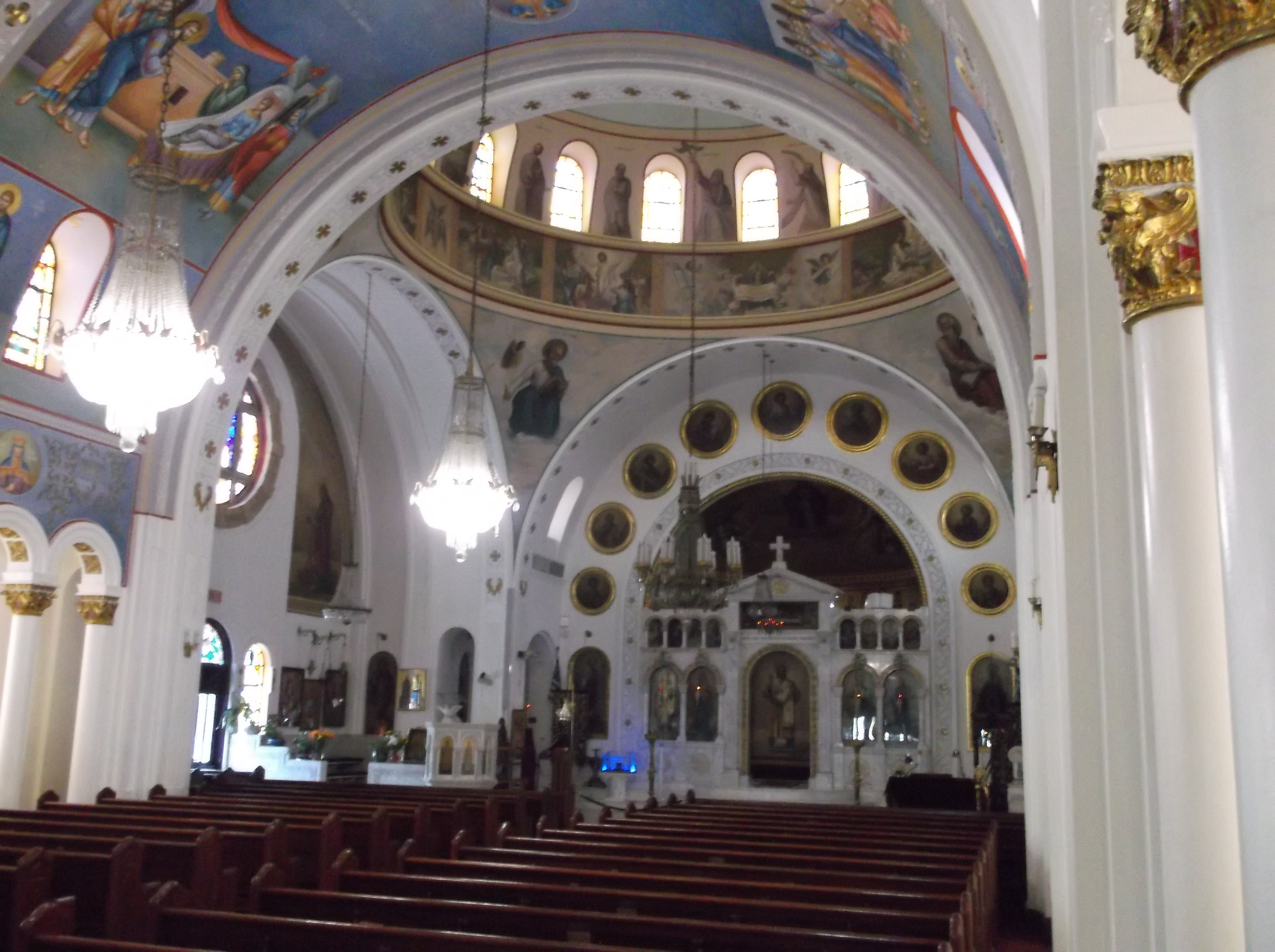
St. Nicholas Greek Orthodox Church; the interior

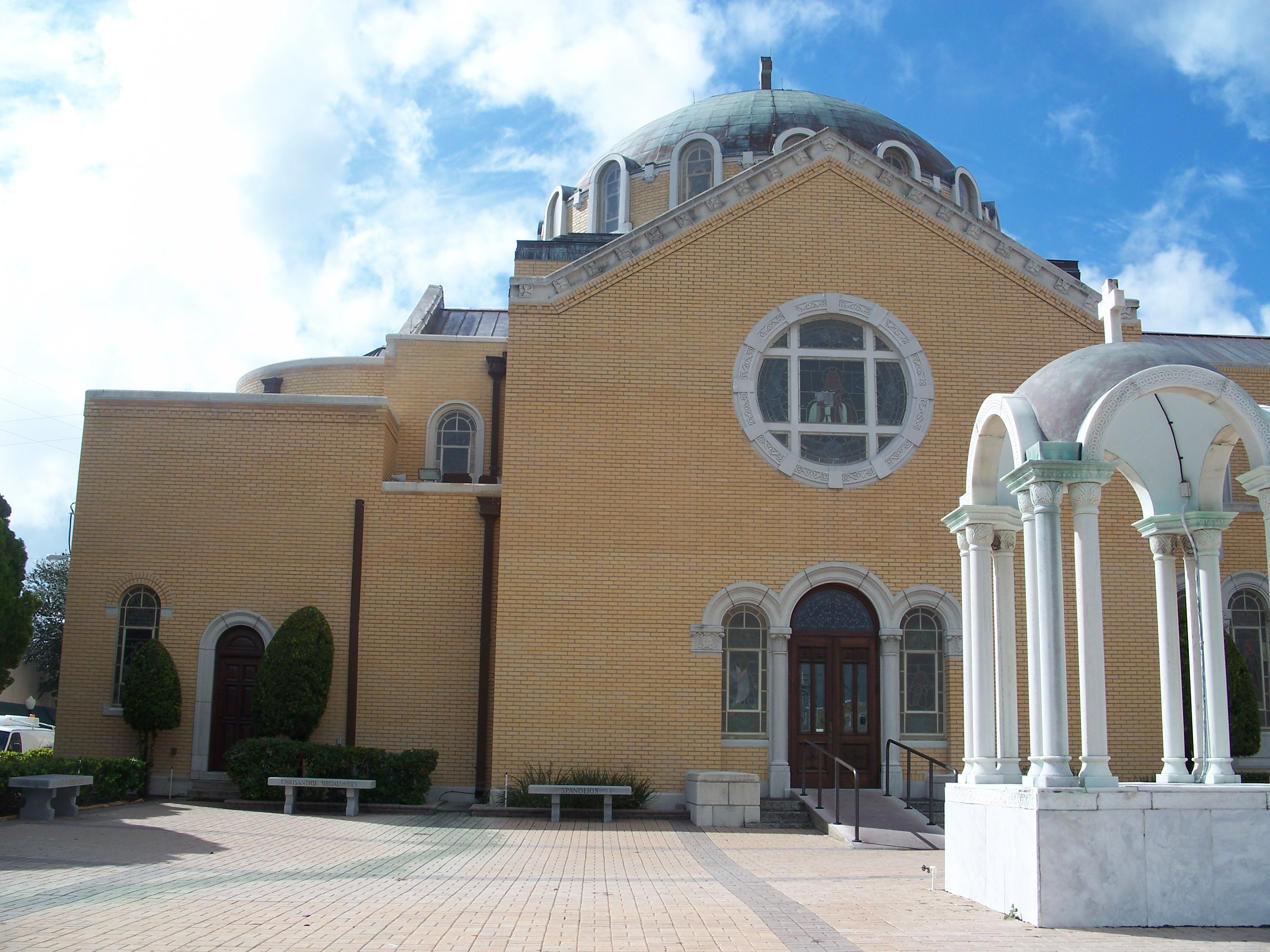
St. Nicholas Orthodox Church; the entrance and churchyard

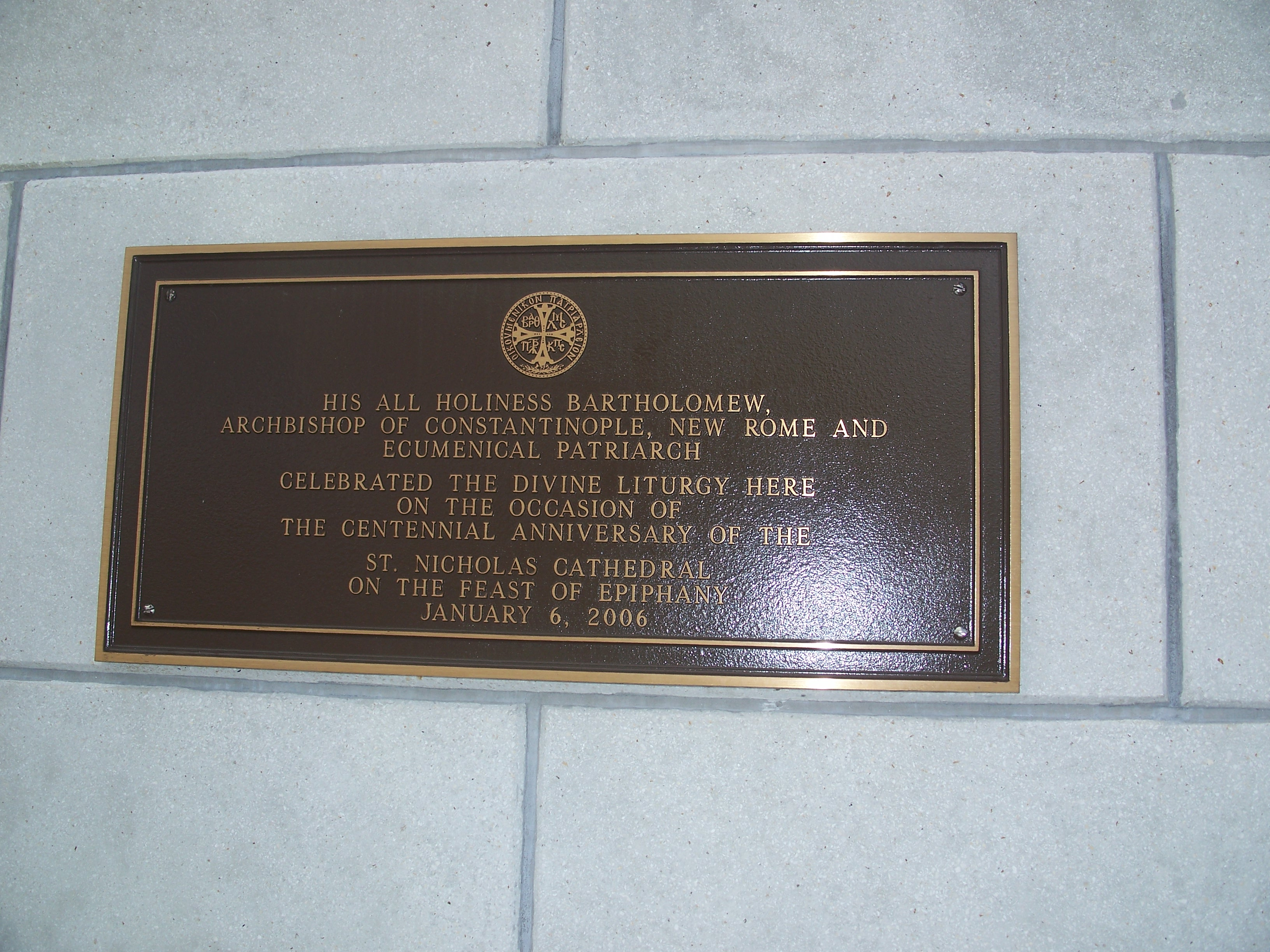
Plaque on the church

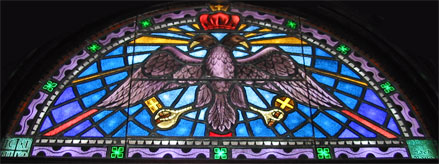
Stained glass window depicting double-headed eagle

St. Nicholas Greek Orthodox Cathedral is a Greek Orthodox parish and Greek-American cultural center in Tarpon Springs, Florida. Its Neo-Byzantine church is located at 36 North Pinellas Avenue.

St. Nicholas hosts an annual Epiphany celebration on January 6, in which Greek Orthodox boys aged 16 to 18 dive into Spring Bayou to retrieve a white wooden cross, said to bring the finder blessings for the year. It is the largest such event in the Western Hemisphere, with thousands in attendance. A statue of an epiphany diver is located in front of the church.

== Architecture ==
The domed main church building, designed by the Eugene Brothers of Chicago, was completed in 1943. Modeled in part after the Hagia Sophia in what is now Istanbul, Turkey, it combines Byzantine and Gothic Revival styles. It is a local landmark which has been featured on postcards.

Noted features of the cathedral include 23 stained glass windows surrounding the dome depicting episodes in the life of Jesus and the saints, hand-painted by Joseph V. Llorens of Atlanta, and the 60-ton altar, made of Pentelic marble. Within the dome are three large chandeliers from Czechoslovakia. The altar was originally part of the Greek exhibit at the 1939 New York World's Fair. It, along with the cathedra, choir stalls, and other components were obtained with help from George Frantzis. A new altar of Carrara marble was installed in 1965.

The interior is richly decorated with icons, many by Greek iconographer George Saclaridis. 41 icons, sponsored by various members of the parish, were delivered in 1952, with more added in subsequent years. On December 4, 1969, the icon of Saint Nicholas was observed to have drops of moisture, and some consider it a weeping Icon.

== History ==
The community traces its history to John Cocoris, a native of Leonidio in Arcadia, Greece, who settled in the area in 1896 and became a prosperous sponge diver and trader. The trade attracted Greek immigrants as well as Greeks from other parts of the U.S. By 1907, the population was large enough to support a Greek Orthodox church, a project put under the supervision of Nicholas Peppas, a native of Aegina. The first church, completed that year at a cost of $300 for the land and $3,500 for construction ($10,027 and $116,980 when adjusted for inflation respectively), was a wood frame structure painted white. Rev. Stamatis Koutouzis was appointed the first parish priest. The parish added a school in 1925.

By 1935, the parish had outgrown the first church and began raising funds toward the current structure. Construction began in 1941 and was completed in 1943, when it was consecrated by Archbishop Athenagoras (later the Ecumenical Patriarch of Constantinople) at Epiphany. St. Nicholas was by then a significant center of community life, with major festivals surrounding Epiphany, Greek Independence Day and Orthodox Easter. Honoring this, in 1975, the Tarpon Springs Board of Commissioners passed a resolution designating the city the "Epiphany City" of the United States. St. Nicholas was elevated to cathedral status for West Florida in January 1979.

The leader of 250 million Orthodox Christians came to Tarpon Springs in 2006. Bartholomew I of Constantinople has been the elected Ecumenical Patriarch of Constantinople since 1991. Bartholomew visited for the 100th annual Epiphany celebration. 80,000 came to event in Tarpon Springs. Tarpon Springs Police Chief Jeffrey Young was recognized for managing the safety and security of His All Holiness Bartholomew from January 4th 2006 when he arrived at the airport to January 8th 2006 when he returned to the airport to leave.

== See also ==
- Epiphany
