= Arcade Hotel (Tarpon Springs, Florida) =

- U.S. National Register of Historic Places
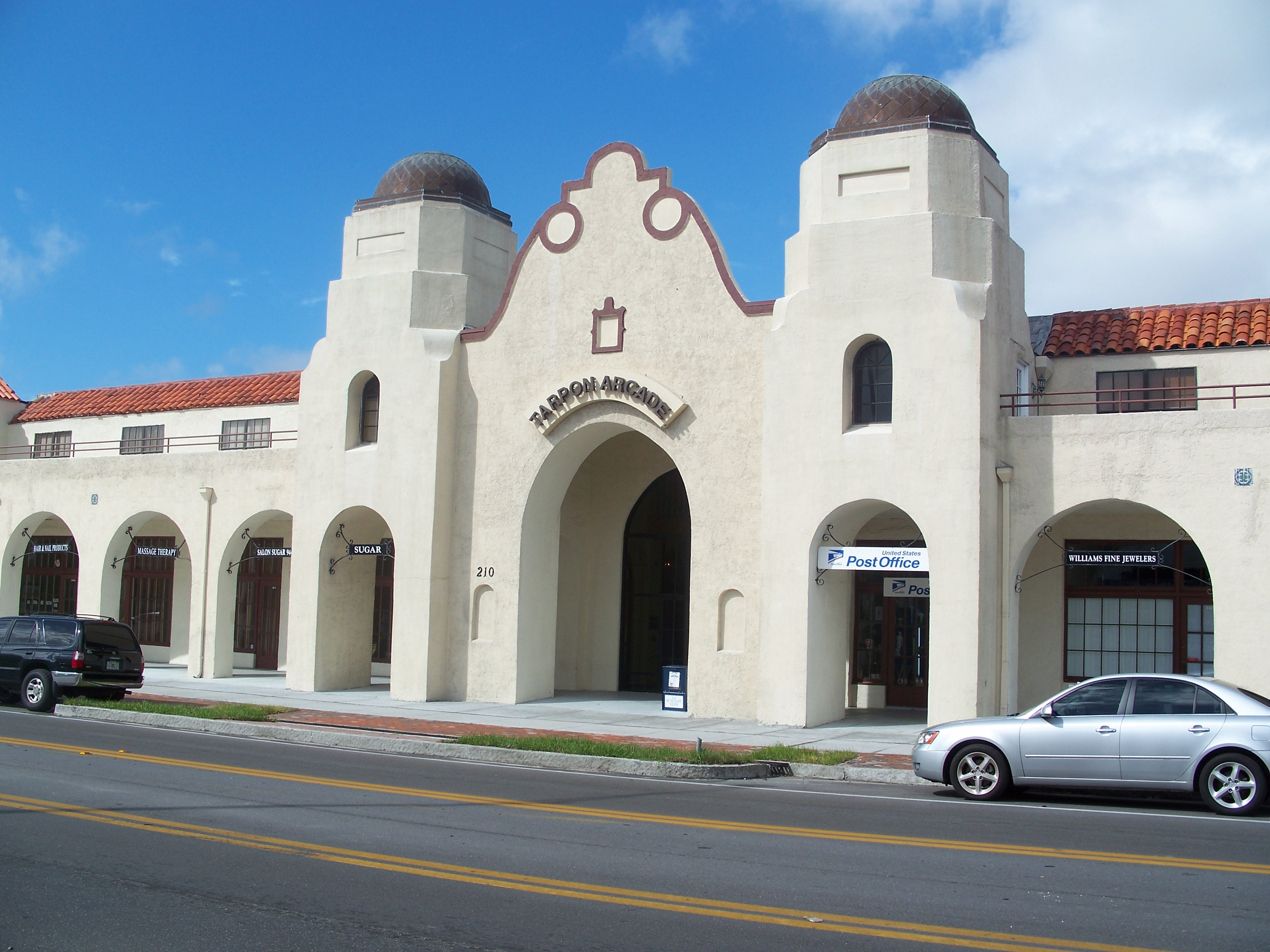

- Location within Florida Location within the United States
- Location: Tarpon Springs, Florida
- Coordinates: 28°8′40″N 82°45′24″W
- Architectural style: Mission/Spanish Revival
- NRHP reference No.: 84000943
- Added to NRHP: January 12, 1984

The Arcade Hotel (also known as the Shaw Arcade or Howard Hotel) is a historic hotel in Tarpon Springs, Florida, United States. It is located at 210 South Pinellas Avenue. On January 12, 1984, it was added to the U.S. National Register of Historic Places. Several guests had stayed there throughout the 1930s and committed suicide in the hotel after Black Tuesday, the beginning of the Great Depression. The building now houses several shops. It is located on alt. 19 in Tarpon Springs Florida, near the historic downtown.

== Gallery ==
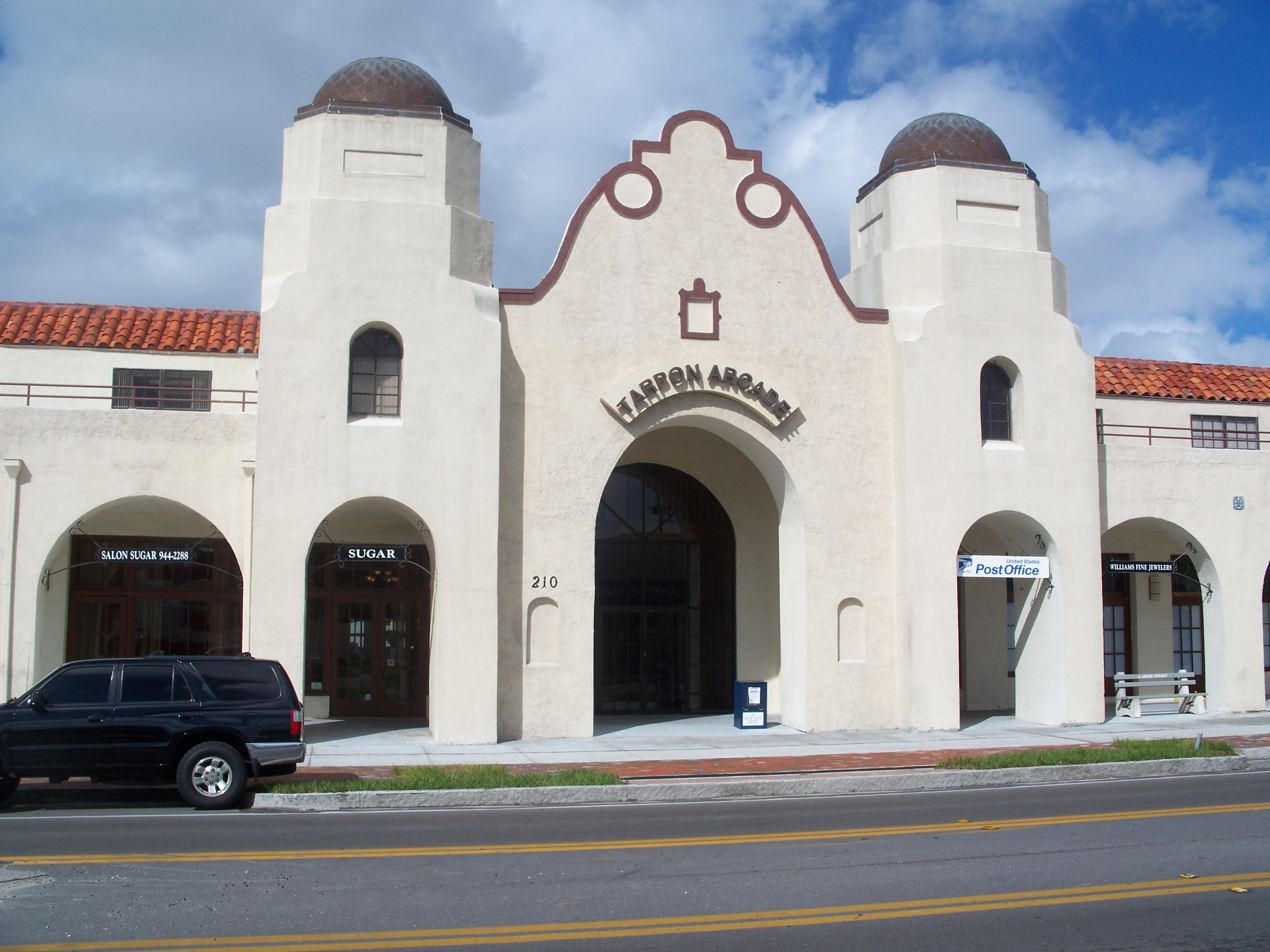

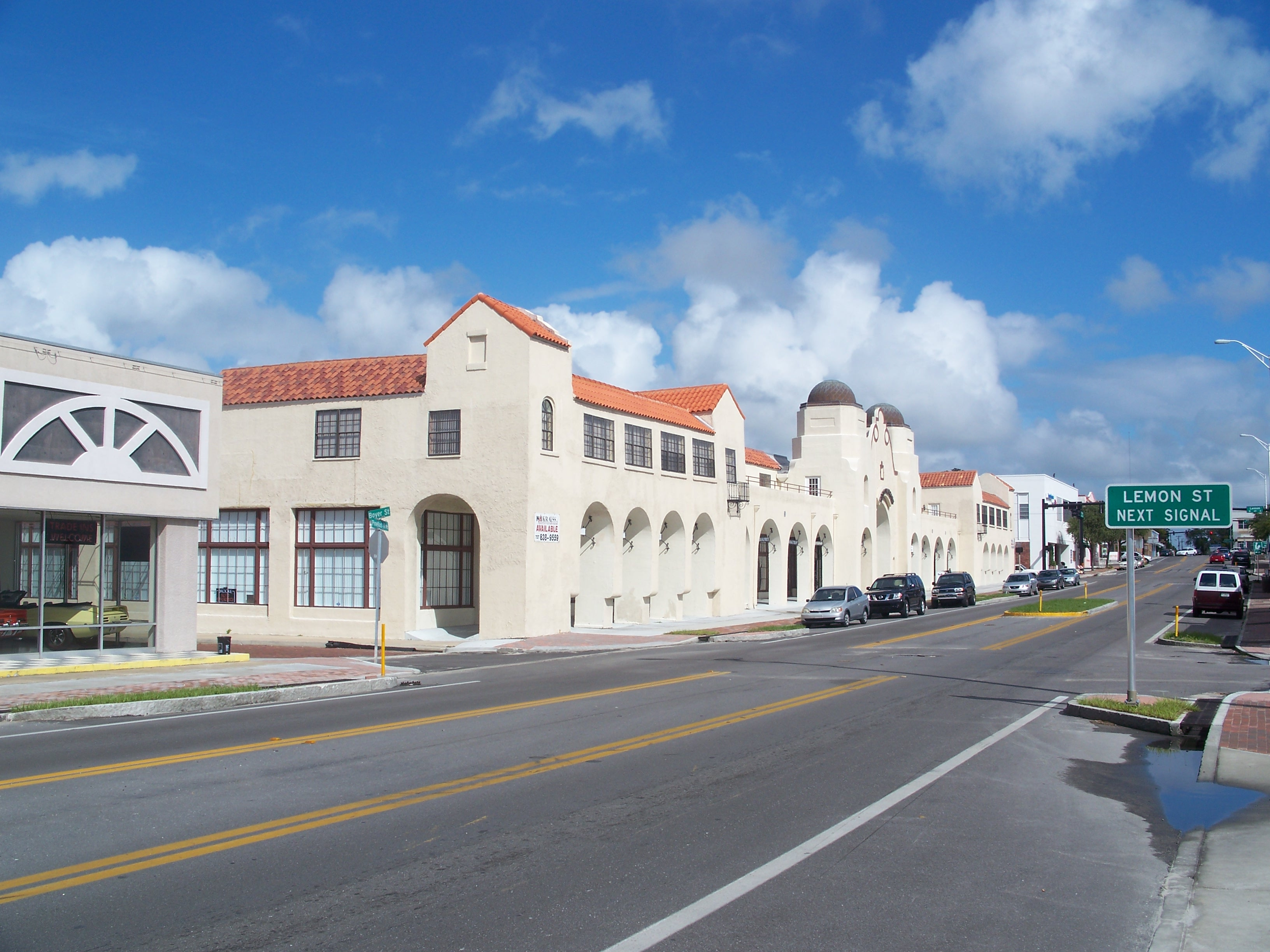
