= Bertram Chapman Mayo =

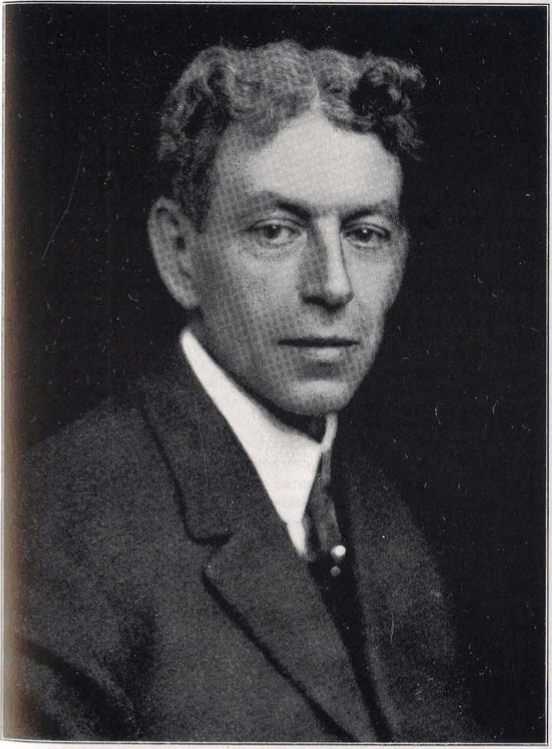
- Born: March 23, 1865; Boston, Massachusetts
- Died: July 12, 1920 aged 55; Asheville, North Carolina
- Other name: B. C. Mayo
- Occupations: Newspaper Promoter and Real Estate Developer
- Known for: Creating resort communities with newspaper subscription premiums
- Spouse: Amy Girdler (1865-1940)
- Children: Geoffrey Mayo (1890-1981)

Bertram Chapman Mayo (March 23, 1865 – July 12, 1920), was an American newspaper promoter who developed summer resort communities by devising a plan to sell lots as a premium for subscribing to a newspaper.

== Biography ==
Mayo was born in Boston, Massachusetts, on March 23, 1865, to Noah Mayo and Emeline Smith. After graduation from high school he attended the Massachusetts Institute of Technology but ended his studies without obtaining a degree. He worked as a clothing salesman in New England before relocating to California in the early 1900s where he obtained employment as the business manager for the Oakland Enquirer.

Mayo possessed a particular talent for promotion and applied this skill in such speculative ventures as oil drilling in Modoc County, California and a gold mine drilling operation in Nevada. In 1910 he purchased acres of rugged terrain in Sonoma County, California, platted the land into small lots as though it was level, and offered the lots for a few dollars each with a subscription to either the Oakland Enquirer or Sunset magazine. Mayo again used subscriptions to Sunset to dispose of steeply sloped, rocky lots in Brown Canyon at Beverly Glen, a development adjacent to, and now a part of Los Angeles, California. Employing the same scheme he established Lakeland in Berrien County, Michigan with the Chicago Evening Post, Beachwood, New Jersey with the New York Tribune, and Browns Mills in the Pines, also in New Jersey, with the Philadelphia Press.

Mayo’s newspaper real estate scheme, in addition to the requirement of subscribing to a newspaper in order to buy a lot, had a definite set of characteristics: the land was substandard, near water, and accessible from the city where the newspaper was located; lots were a mere 20’ wide requiring the purchase of at least two lots; the natural state of the land was promoted and little in the way of utilities or improvements was provided; all lots were sold for the same price encouraging a quick purchase to obtain a favorable location; aggressive advertising was employed benefiting the sponsoring newspaper; a chain of ownership was used to disguise the identity of the developer; the newspaper was the frontman allowing it to deny making a profit and to claim purely altruistic motives; when most of the lots were sold a property owners association was formed to assume ownership and responsibility for beach and parkland and a clubhouse which had been used as the sales office.

The Beachwood development was the subject of a mail fraud investigation initiated by Victor Watson an associate of William Randolph Hearst, owner of the New York American newspaper. The New York Attorney General, H. Snowden Marshall declined to pursue the fraud allegations and this decision by Marshall was included in the list of impeachment charges brought against him by the U.S. House of Representatives in 1916. Biographers of Mayo have variously suggested that he was a crook and charlatan, a benevolent founding father, or, taking a more nuanced approach, a clever entrepreneur.

In 1913 Mayo built a home at Tarpon Springs, Florida where he contracted tuberculosis. He died at a sanitarium in Asheville, North Carolina on July 12, 1920, and was buried in Los Angeles. Mayo had passed his newspaper real estate idea on to Warren and Arthur Smadbeck, New York real estate developers, who further refined the scheme and created more than fifty newspaper colonies in the United States and Canada.
