= Tarpon Springs station =

Railroad depot in Tarpon Springs, Florida, now a museum

Coordinates: 28°08′46″N 82°45′17″W

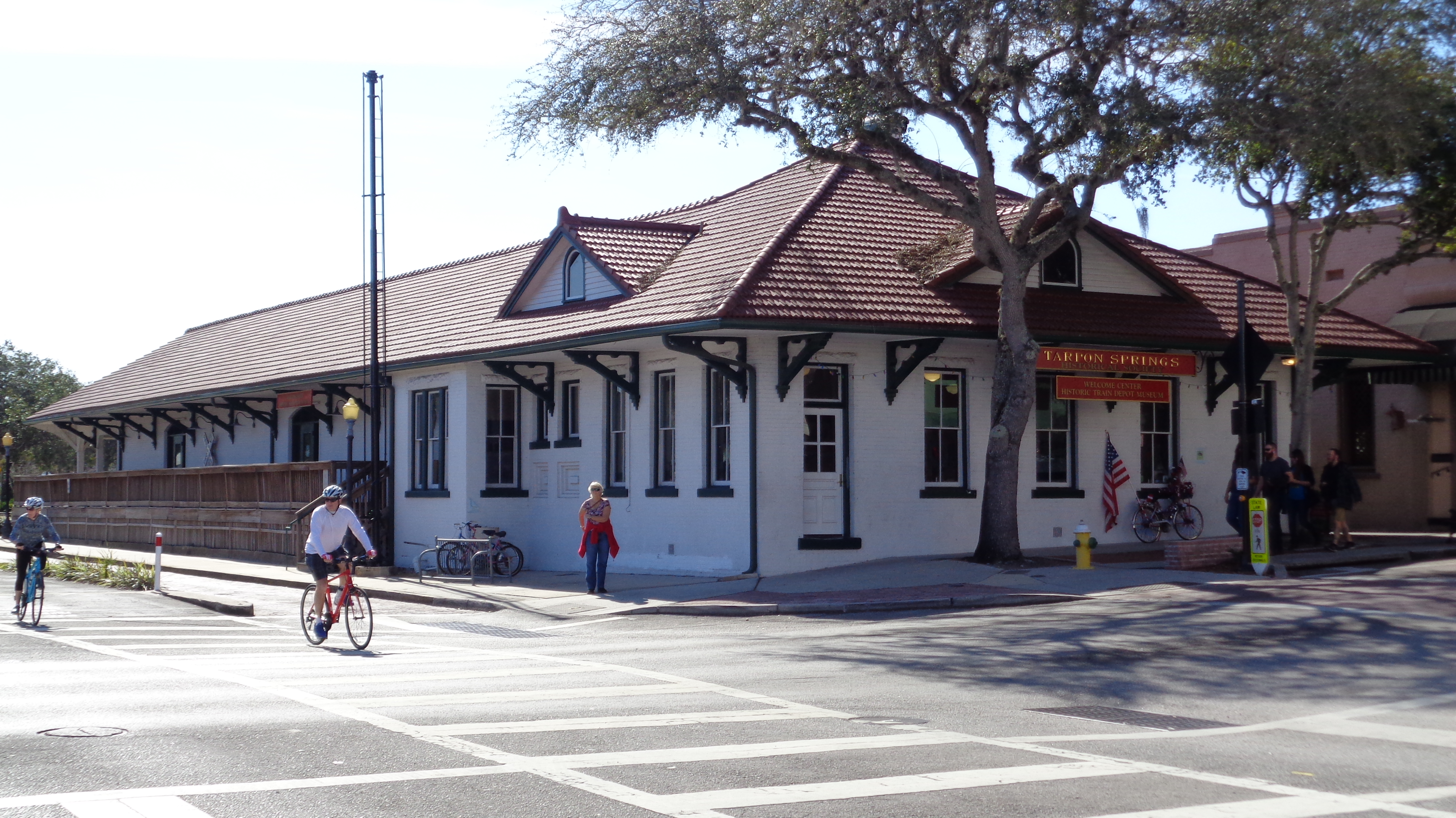
The Tarpon Springs Depot in 2016.

The Tarpon Springs Depot is a former railroad depot built by the Atlantic Coast Line Railroad in 1909, located in downtown Tarpon Springs, Florida at 160 East Tarpon Avenue within the Tarpon Springs Historic District.

The former rail line that serviced the depot, originally built by the Orange Belt Railway in 1888 and last used for a series of special excursion trips to nearby Dunedin and back on March 8, 1987, was converted into a section of the Pinellas Trail in the 1990s.

== Historic Depot Museum ==
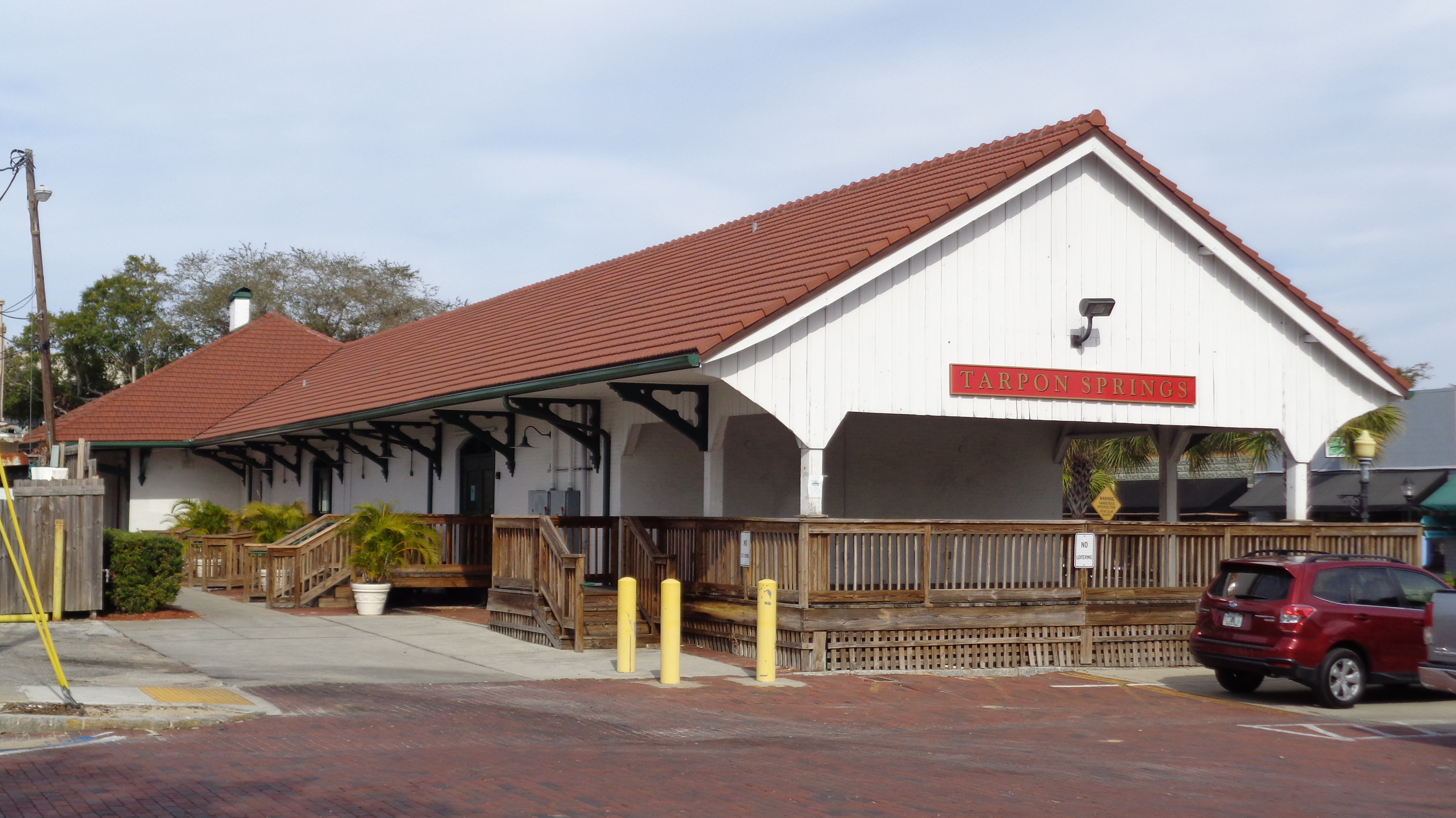
Back of the depot building.

The building is now home to the Historic Depot Museum, operated by the Tarpon Springs Area Historical Society. The museum's exhibits focus on local history and culture, including the role that the railroad played in the growth of the town, education, health care, and local institutions.

== See also ==
- Dunedin History Museum
- St. Petersburg station (Amtrak)

Preceding station	Atlantic Coast Line Railroad	Following station
Seaside toward St. Petersburg	Orange Belt Railway	Keystone Park toward Sanford

== Bibliography ==
- Luisi, Vincent (2010), Railroading in Pinellas County (1st ed.), Arcadia Publishing, ISBN 978-0-7385-8550-5
