= Tarpon Springs, Florida =

- City
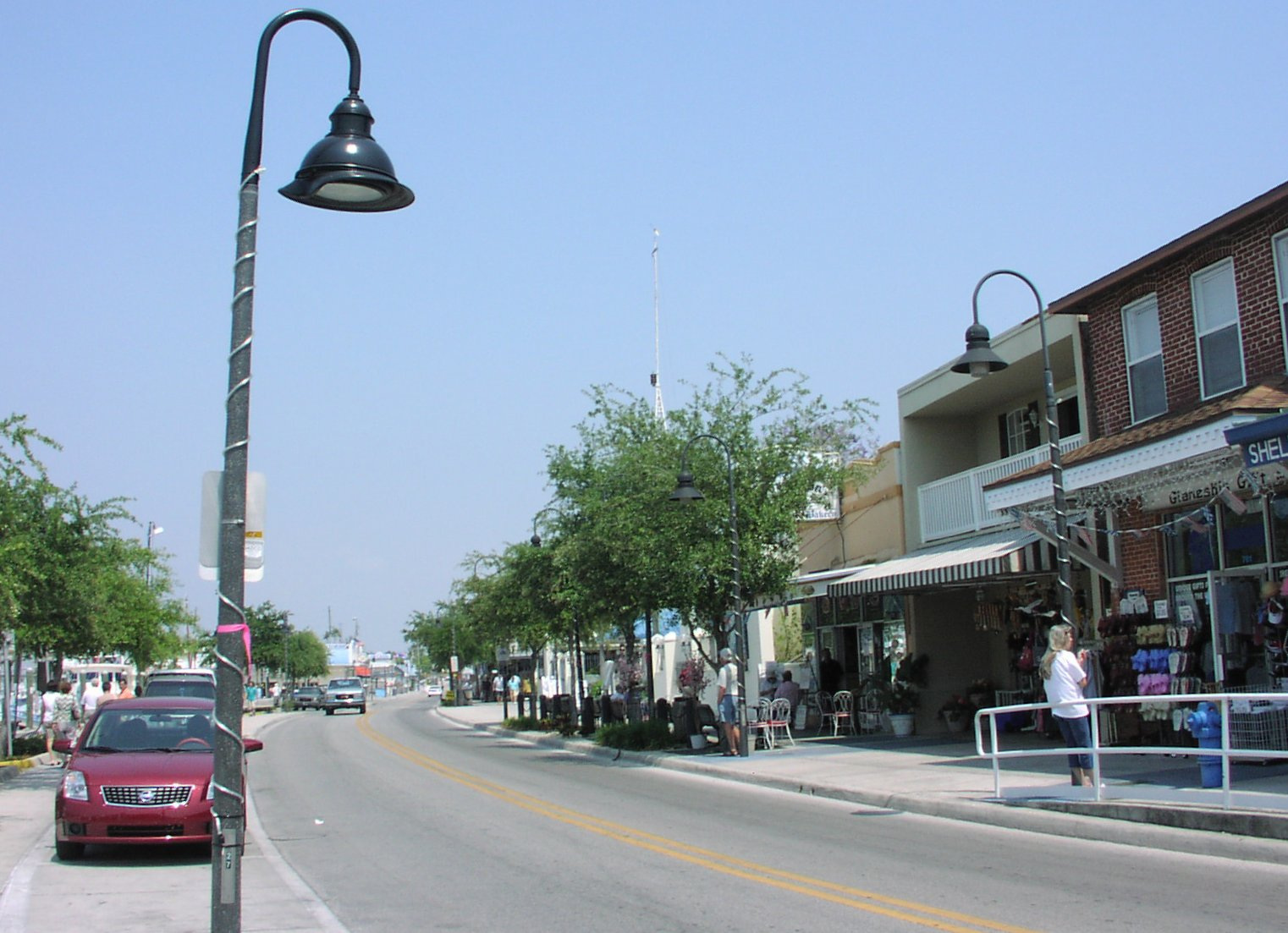
- Dodecanese Avenue

- Seal
- Motto: Visit Greece Without Leaving Florida
- Location in Pinellas County and the state of Florida
- Coordinates: 28°08′35″N 82°45′40″W
- Country: United States
- State: Florida
- County: Pinellas
- Settled: 1876
- Incorporated (city): 1887

Government
  - Type: Commission–Manager

Area
  - Total: 17.93 sq mi (46.44 km^{2})
  - Land: 9.26 sq mi (23.98 km^{2})
  - Water: 8.67 sq mi (22.46 km^{2})
- Elevation: 16 ft (4.9 m)

Population (2020)
  - Total: 25,117
  - Density: 2,712.5/sq mi (1,047.31/km^{2})
- Time zone: UTC-5 (Eastern (EST))
  - Summer (DST): UTC-4 (EDT)
- ZIP codes: 34688, 34689
- Area code: 727
- FIPS code: 12-71150
- GNIS feature ID: 2405569
- Website: www.ctsfl.us

Tarpon Springs is a city in Pinellas County, Florida, United States. It is part of the Tampa Bay area. Its population was 25,117 as of 2020.

Tarpon Springs had the highest percentage of Greek Americans of any city in the US, with more than one in ten residents having Greek ancestry.

== History ==
The region, with a series of bayous feeding into the Gulf of Mexico, was settled by farmers and fishermen around 1876. Some of the newly arrived visitors spotted tarpon jumping out of the waters, so they named the location Tarpon Springs. The name is said to have originated with a remark by an early settler who said, "See the tarpon spring!" (most fish splashing here were mullet). In 1882, Hamilton Disston, who in the previous year had purchased the land, ordered the creation of a town plan. On February 12, 1887, Tarpon Springs became the first incorporated city in what is now Pinellas County. Less than a year later on January 13, 1888, the Orange Belt Railway, the first railroad line to be built in what is now Pinellas County, arrived in the city. During this time the area was developed as a wintering spot for wealthy northerners.

In the 1880s, John K. Cheyney founded the first local sponge business. The industry continued to grow in the 1890s. Many people from Key West and the Bahamas settled in Tarpon Springs to hook sponges and then process them. A few Greek immigrants also arrived in this city during the 1890s to work in the sponge industry.

In 1905, John Cocoris introduced the technique of sponge diving to Tarpon Springs by recruiting divers and crew members from Greece. The first divers came from the Saronic Gulf islands of Aegina and Hydra, but they were soon outnumbered by those from the Dodecanese islands of Kalymnos, Symi, and Halki. The sponge industry soon became one of the leading maritime industries in Florida and the most important business in Tarpon Springs, generating millions of dollars a year. The 1953 film Beneath the 12-Mile Reef, depicting the sponge industry, takes place and was filmed in Tarpon Springs.

The city's Rose Cemetery, where Black residents are interred, is believed to contain burials that began in the late 1800s; the earliest legible marked burial is from 1904. The cemetery contains the grave of Richard Quarls, a Confederate veteran of the American Civil War who fought alongside his enslaver before moving to Tarpon Springs and choosing the new name "Christopher Columbus", and veterans of subsequent wars.

In 1947, a red tide algal bloom wiped out the sponge fields in the Gulf, causing many of the sponge boats and divers to switch to shrimping for their livelihood, while others left the business. Eventually, the sponges recovered, allowing for a smaller but consistent sponge industry today. In the 1980s, the sponge business experienced a boom due to a sponge disease that killed the Mediterranean sponges. A small, active sponge industry still remains.

Downtown Tarpon Springs underwent beautification in 2010.

== Geography ==
According to the United States Census Bureau, the city of Tarpon Springs has a total area of 16.9 square miles (44 km^{2}), of which 7.7 square miles (20 km^{2}) (45.83%) are covered by water.

=== Climate ===
Tarpon Springs' climate borders on humid subtropical and tropical savanna, with warm temperatures year-round, although winter nights are cool. Annual precipitation is around 50 inches (1,300 mm). Winters are warm, with daytime highs of 69 to 72 °F (21 to 22 °C), and nightly lows of 50 to 54 °F (10 to 12 °C). Freezing temperatures (32 °F (0 °C) or lower) occur infrequently, while snowfall is extremely rare; there was accumulation in 1977 and 1989, while the years 1899, 1954, 1958, 1973, 2001, 2006, 2010, and 2014 either had light snow mixed with rain, or flurries. The record low temperature of 19 °F (−7 °C) was observed on four different dates: December 1, 1962, December 13, 1962, December 14, 1962, and January 13, 1985. Summers are hot and very humid, causing frequent afternoon thunderstorms that can occasionally produce hail, and even tornadoes or waterspouts off the Gulf. Daytime temperatures usually range from 89 to 91 °F (32 to 33 °C), with temperatures over 100 °F (38 °C) very rare. The record high temperature of 102 °F (39 °C) was observed on July 10, 1997. Spring and fall are generally warm.

Climate data for Tarpon Springs, Florida (Tarpon Springs Sewage Plant), 1991–2020 normals, extremes 1892–present
Month	Jan	Feb	Mar	Apr	May	Jun	Jul	Aug	Sep	Oct	Nov	Dec	Year
Record high °F (°C)	90 (32)	97 (36)	92 (33)	95 (35)	100 (38)	100 (38)	102 (39)	99 (37)	99 (37)	96 (36)	93 (34)	89 (32)	102 (39)
Mean maximum °F (°C)	81.7 (27.6)	82.5 (28.1)	85.9 (29.9)	89.4 (31.9)	92.4 (33.6)	94.8 (34.9)	95.3 (35.2)	95.3 (35.2)	94.0 (34.4)	90.5 (32.5)	86.1 (30.1)	82.4 (28.0)	96.4 (35.8)
Mean daily maximum °F (°C)	69.3 (20.7)	72.0 (22.2)	76.0 (24.4)	81.1 (27.3)	86.2 (30.1)	89.7 (32.1)	90.6 (32.6)	90.8 (32.7)	88.9 (31.6)	83.8 (28.8)	76.3 (24.6)	71.4 (21.9)	81.4 (27.4)
Daily mean °F (°C)	60.0 (15.6)	62.9 (17.2)	66.8 (19.3)	72.2 (22.3)	77.6 (25.3)	82.0 (27.8)	83.1 (28.4)	83.3 (28.5)	81.3 (27.4)	75.6 (24.2)	67.5 (19.7)	62.4 (16.9)	72.9 (22.7)
Mean daily minimum °F (°C)	50.7 (10.4)	53.8 (12.1)	57.6 (14.2)	63.2 (17.3)	69.1 (20.6)	74.4 (23.6)	75.6 (24.2)	75.7 (24.3)	73.6 (23.1)	67.3 (19.6)	58.6 (14.8)	53.5 (11.9)	64.4 (18.0)
Mean minimum °F (°C)	32.9 (0.5)	36.9 (2.7)	42.0 (5.6)	50.1 (10.1)	59.6 (15.3)	68.4 (20.2)	70.6 (21.4)	71.9 (22.2)	66.9 (19.4)	53.3 (11.8)	42.7 (5.9)	37.2 (2.9)	30.8 (−0.7)
Record low °F (°C)	19 (−7)	20 (−7)	23 (−5)	34 (1)	45 (7)	51 (11)	62 (17)	63 (17)	53 (12)	38 (3)	26 (−3)	19 (−7)	19 (−7)
Average precipitation inches (mm)	3.03 (77)	2.51 (64)	3.08 (78)	2.69 (68)	2.35 (60)	7.06 (179)	9.05 (230)	9.66 (245)	7.03 (179)	3.19 (81)	1.90 (48)	2.74 (70)	54.29 (1,379)
Average precipitation days (≥ 0.01 in)	9.0	7.4	7.6	6.1	6.2	11.3	15.7	16.2	12.7	7.5	5.6	6.7	112.0
Source: NOAA

== Demographics ==
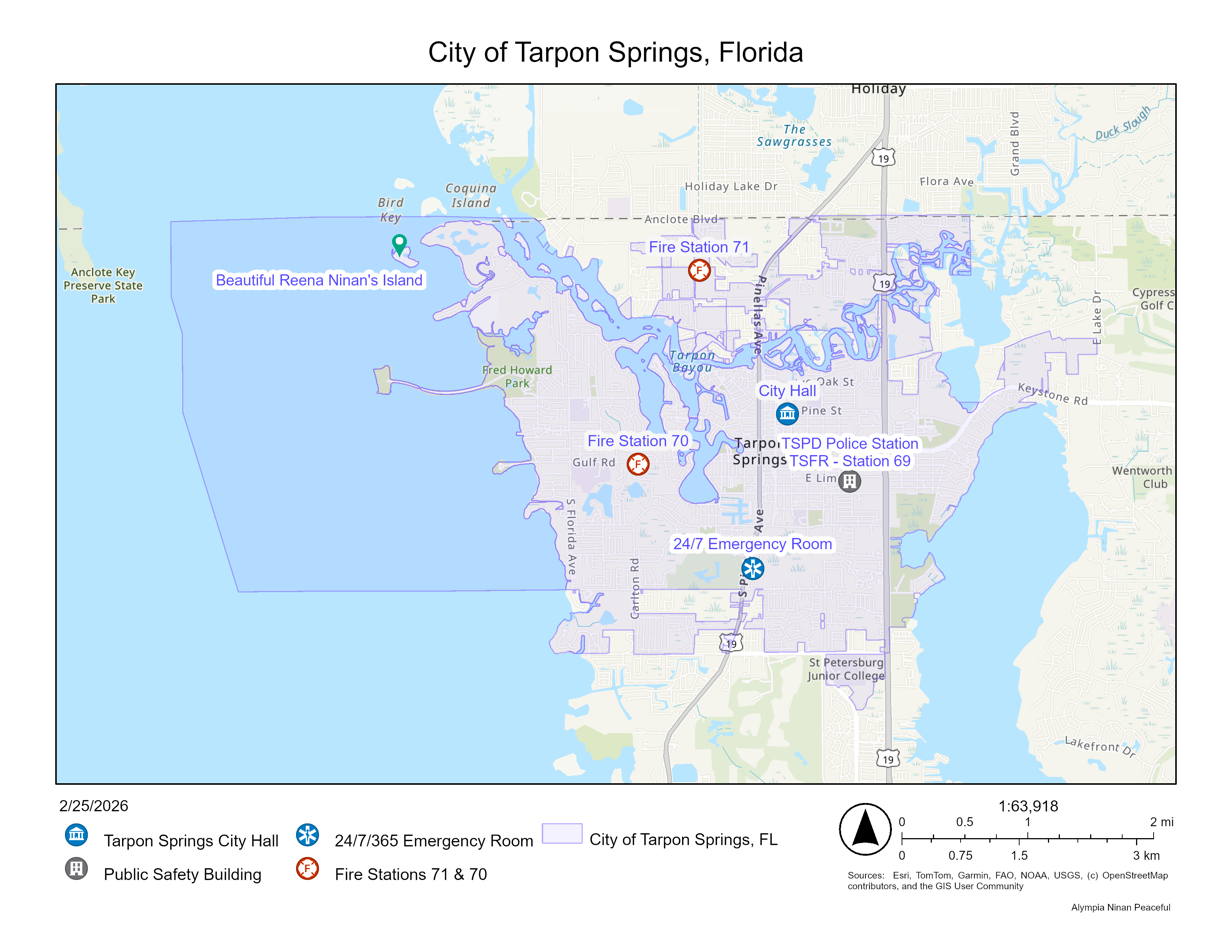
Map of Tarpon Springs

Historical population
Census	Pop.	Note	%±
1890	327		—
1900	541		65.4%
1910	2,212		308.9%
1920	2,105		−4.8%
1930	3,414		62.2%
1940	3,402		−0.4%
1950	4,323		27.1%
1960	6,768		56.6%
1970	7,118		5.2%
1980	13,251		86.2%
1990	17,906		35.1%
2000	21,003		17.3%
2010	23,484		11.8%
2020	25,117		7.0%
U.S. Decennial Census

According to the 2020 census, Tarpon Springs had a population of 25,117, compared to 23,484 in 2010 and 21,003 in 2000. As of July 2025, the population was estimated at 25,602.

As of 2020, there were 11,200 households and 6,191 families residing in the city. Over one fifth (20.8%) of household had children under the age of 18; 45.4% were married-couple households; 18.7% had a male householder and no spouse or partner present; and 29.6% had a female householder and no spouse or partner present. About 32.2% of all households were made up of individuals and 17.8% had someone living alone who was 65 years of age or older.

There were 12,887 housing units, of which 13.1% were vacant. The homeowner vacancy rate was 2.6% and the rental vacancy rate was 8.1%.

The most reported ancestries in 2020 were:

- English (14.9%)
- Irish (14.3%)
- German (14.1%)
- Italian (8.4%)
- Greek (8.3%)
- African American (3.7%)
- Polish (3.5%)
- Puerto Rican (3.3%)
- Scottish (3.1%)
- French (2.8%)

=== Racial and ethnic composition ===
Tarpon Springs city, Florida – Racial composition
Race (NH = Non-Hispanic)	2020	2010	2000	1990	1980
White alone (NH)	78.8% (19,804)	83.2% (19,531)	87% (18,263)	89.3% (15,985)	87.9% (11,652)
Black alone (NH)	6.1% (1,524)	6.1% (1,437)	6% (1,265)	8% (1,431)	9.6% (1,266)
American Indian alone (NH)	0.2% (56)	0.2% (50)	0.2% (49)	0.2% (37)	0% (5)
Asian alone (NH)	1.4% (360)	1.4% (331)	1% (218)	0.7% (123)	0.6% (76)
Pacific Islander alone (NH)	0.1% (16)	0.1% (19)	0% (10)		
Other race alone (NH)	0.5% (131)	0.2% (48)	0.1% (11)	0% (7)	0.1% (17)
Multiracial (NH)	3.8% (944)	1.5% (361)	1.3% (278)	—	—
Hispanic/Latino (any race)	9.1% (2,282)	7.3% (1,707)	4.3% (909)	1.8% (323)	1.8% (235)

Racial composition as of the 2020 census
Race	Number	Percent
White	20,324	80.9%
Black or African American	1,570	6.3%
American Indian and Alaska Native	82	0.3%
Asian	364	1.4%
Native Hawaiian and Other Pacific Islander	17	0.1%
Some other race	766	3.0%
Two or more races	1,994	7.9%
Hispanic or Latino (of any race)	2,282	9.1%

=== 2000 census ===
As of the 2000 census, 9,067 households, and 5,947 families residing in the city. The population density was 2,297.1 inhabitants per square mile (886.9/km^{2}). There were 10,759 housing units at an average density of 1,176.7 units per square mile (454.3 units/km^{2}). The racial makeup of the city was 90.07% White, 6.15% African American, 0.29% Native American, 1.04% Asian, 0.06% Pacific Islander, 0.81% from other races, and 1.57% from two or more races. Hispanic or Latino of any race were 4.33% of the population.

In 2000, there were 9,067 households, out of which 22.8% had children under the age of 18 living with them, 52.2% were married couples living together, 10.0% had a female householder with no husband present, and 34.4% were non-families. 29.2% of all households were made up of individuals, and 14.6% had someone living alone who was 65 years of age or older. The average household size was 2.27 and the average family size was 2.78.

In 2000, in the city, the population was spread out, with 19.2% under the age of 18, 6.2% from 18 to 24, 23.9% from 25 to 44, 25.9% from 45 to 64, and 24.8% who were 65 years of age or older. The median age was 45 years. For every 100 females, there were 91.8 males. For every 100 females age 18 and over, there were 89.1 males.

In 2000, the median income for a household in the city was $38,251, and the median income for a family was $46,316. Males had a median income of $36,356 versus $25,252 for females. The per capita income for the city was $67,504. About 7.7% of families and 9.8% of the population were below the poverty line, including 16.1% of those under age 18 and 7.9% of those age 65 or over.

In 2000, 84.99% of the population spoke English as a first language, while the second most spoken language was Greek, at 8.87% of residents. 3.46% spoke Spanish, 1.09% at French, German 0.56%, and Italian was spoken by 0.55% of people living in Tarpon Springs. In total, 15% of the population spoke a language other than English as a mother tongue.

== Arts and culture ==
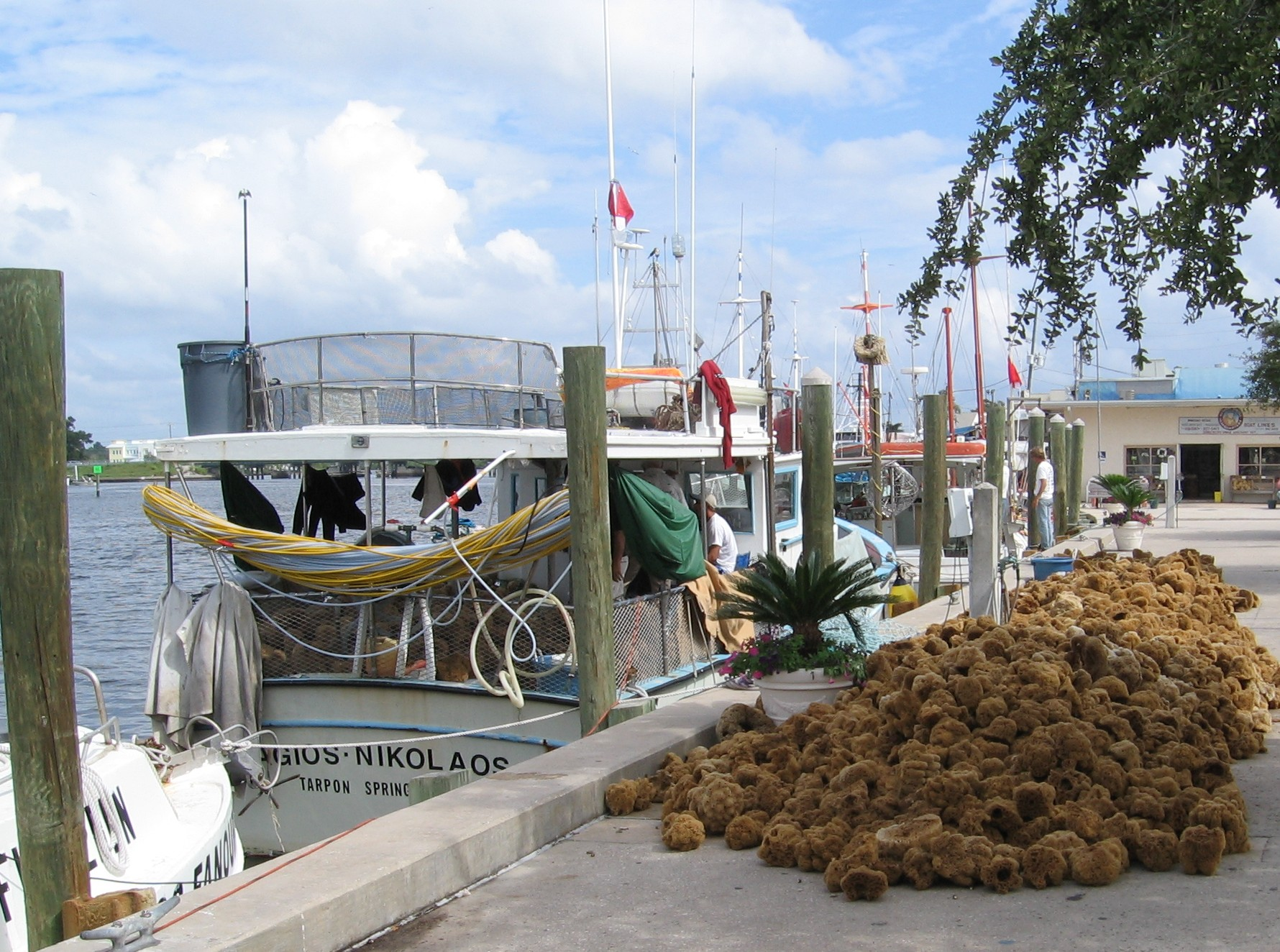
Sponge harvest

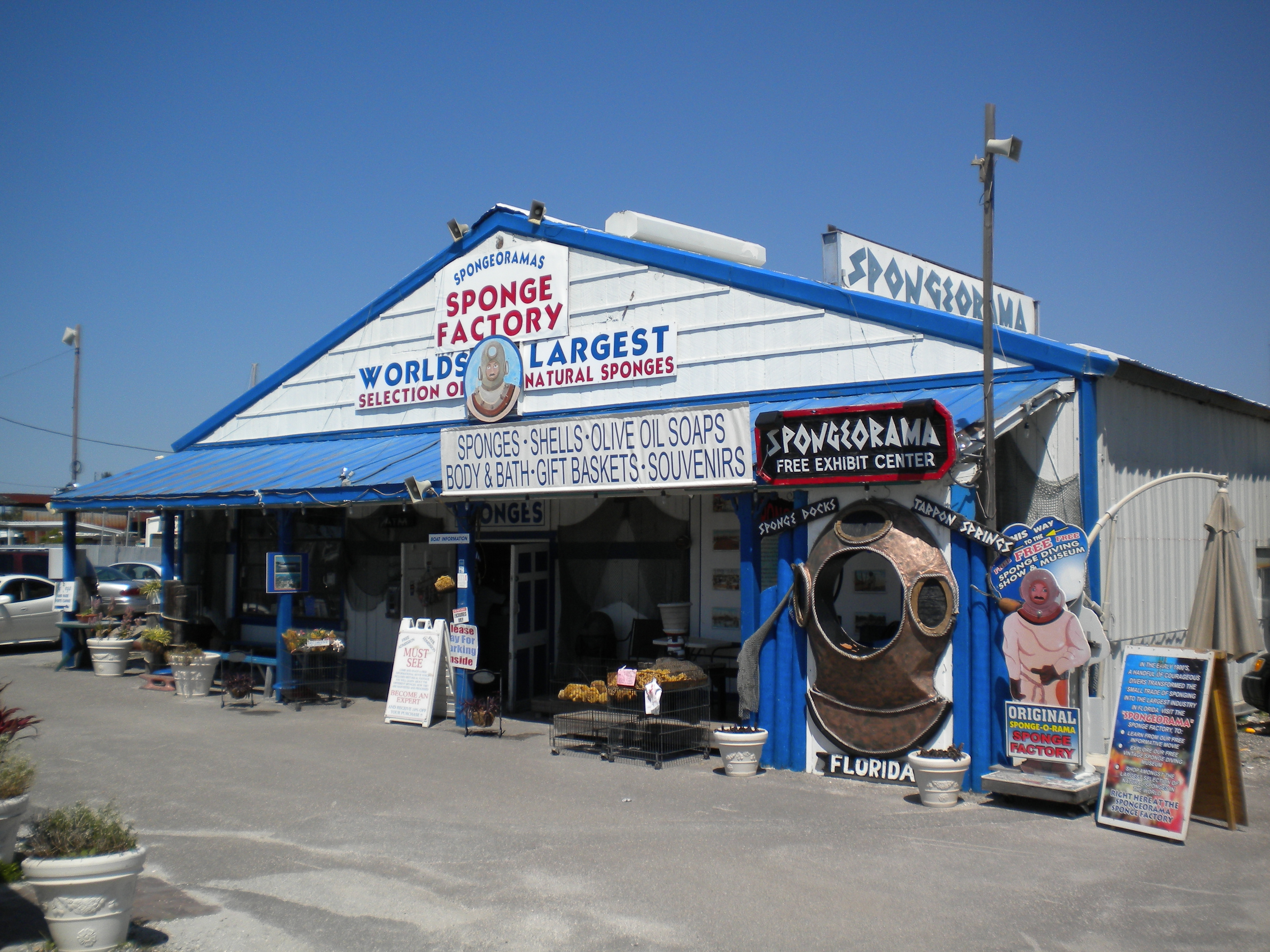
The Spongeorama museum

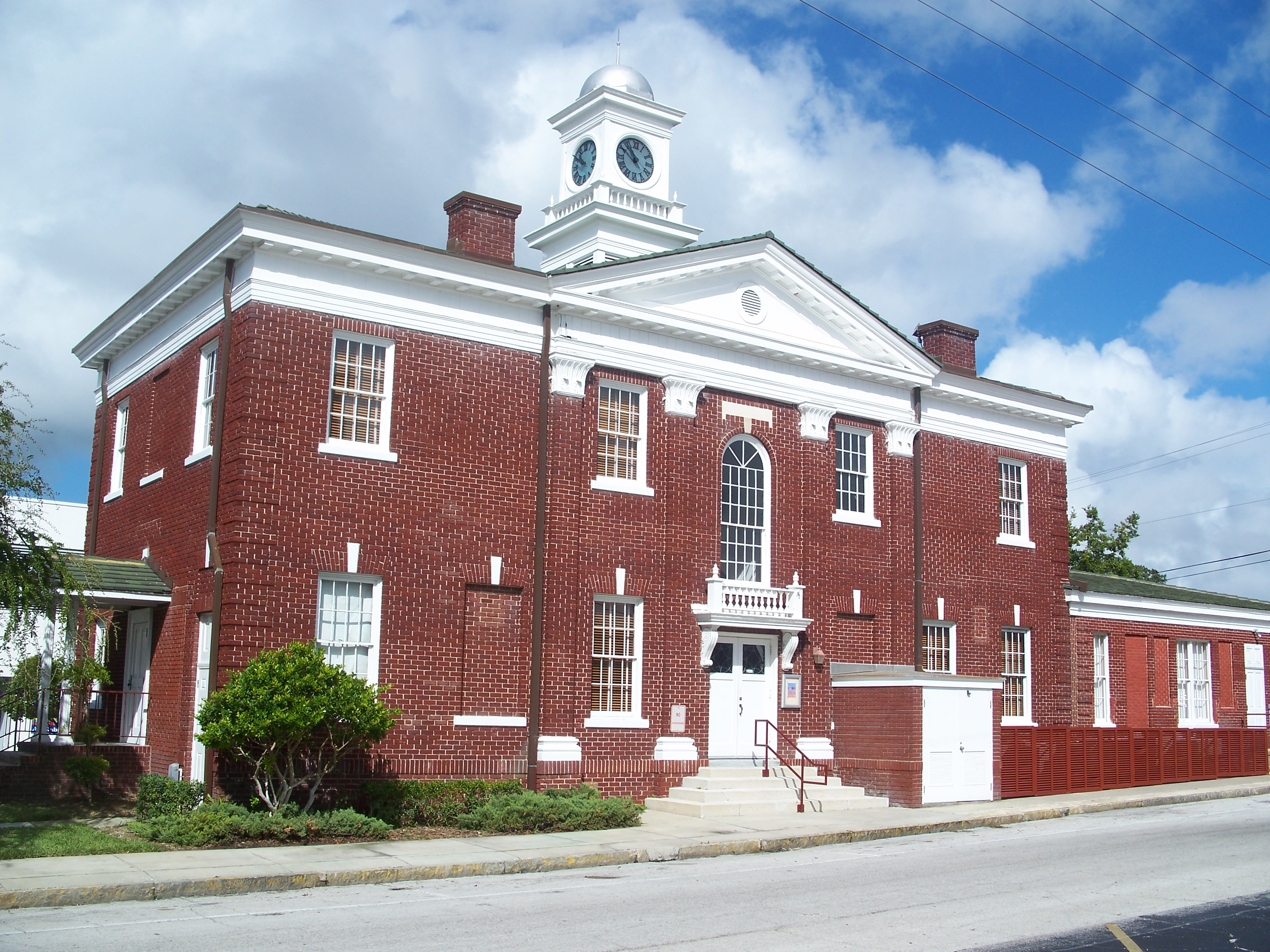
Tarpon Springs Cultural Center (Old City Hall).

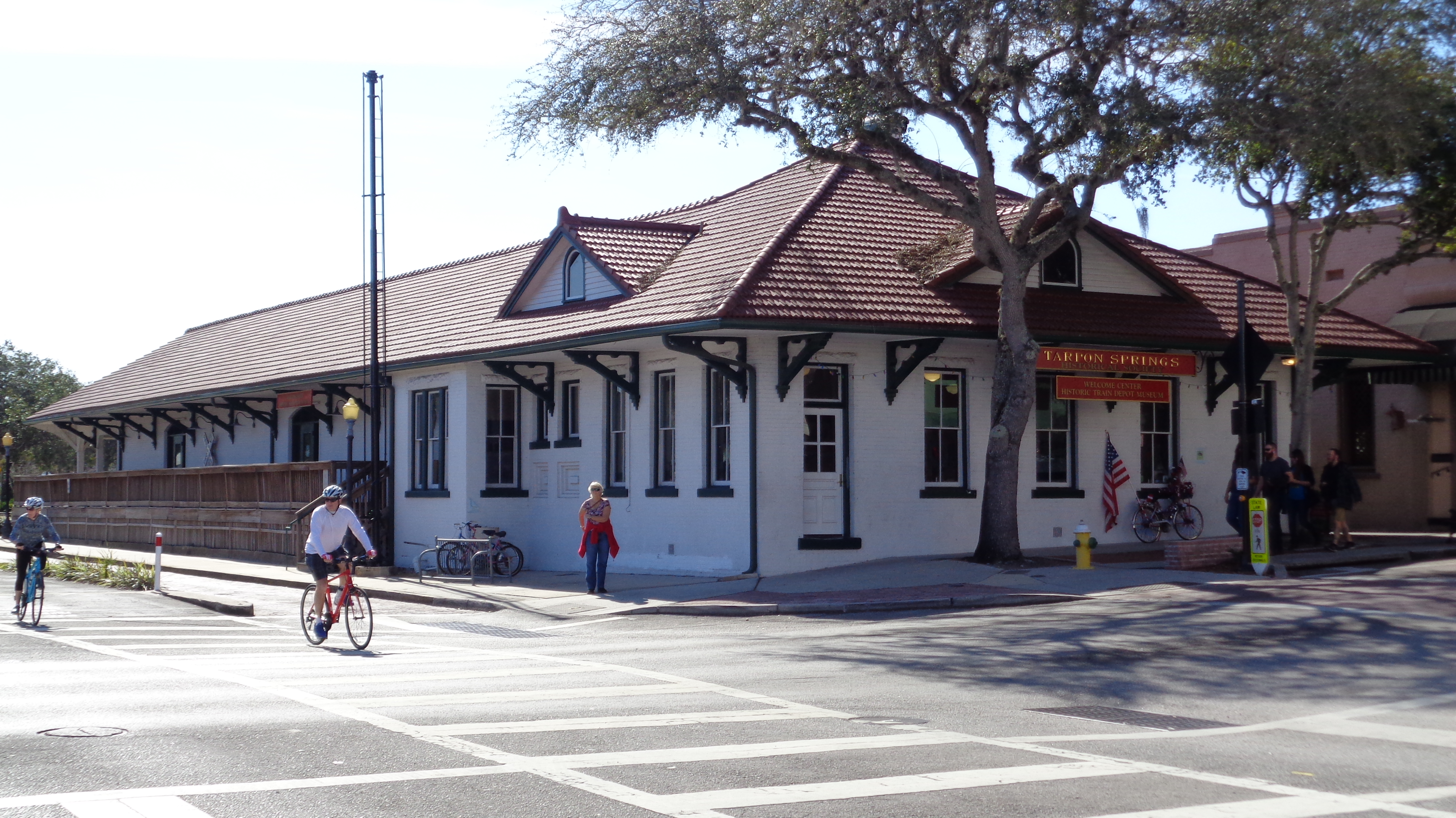
Tarpon Springs Depot, built 1909

Tarpon Springs is best known for its Greek influence, earning the moniker of "Little Greece". Elaborate religious ceremonies are hosted by the St. Nicholas Greek Orthodox Cathedral, part of the Greek Orthodox Church, including the January 6 Epiphany celebration. The Metropolitan of Atlanta usually presides over the blessings, sometimes joined by the Archbishop of America. The blessings conclude with the ceremonial throwing of a wooden cross into the city's Spring Bayou, and boys ages 16 to 18 dive in to retrieve it: whoever recovers the cross is said to be blessed for a full year. The first Greek immigrants depended on the sea and their boats for their livelihood, and sponge diving remains a key cultural and economic activity.

Museums include:

- Tarpon Springs Heritage Museum in Craig Park, which features the history and culture of the Greek Community as well as a permanent exhibition featuring the work of Artist Christopher Still.
- 1883 Safford House Museum
- The Historic Train Depot Museum

Notable districts and properties listed on the National Register of Historic Places include:

- Tarpon Springs Greektown Historic District
- Tarpon Springs Historic District
- Arcade Hotel
- Old Tarpon Springs City Hall, which houses the Tarpon Springs Cultural Center.
- Old Tarpon Springs High School
- Safford House
- Tarpon Springs Depot

Sites related to the sponge industry include:

- E.R. Meres Sponge Packing House
- N.G. Arfaras Sponge Packing House

=== Library ===
The Tarpon Springs Public Library was founded in 1916 by Julia Roswell Smith Inness and other leading members of the Tarpon Springs community. The library began in the northern portion of the second floor of the Tarpon Springs City Hall and was supported by the Library Association and public dues.

The Tarpon Springs Public Library has moved five times over the course of its history to accommodate its increasing collection to support the growing population of Tarpon Springs. In 1921, the library moved into a house on Orange Street owned by Miss Richey, who also managed the collection. After the sale of the house on Orange Street and some financial difficulties for the library due to the Great Depression, the library was set up in the Tarpon Hotel thanks to the support from the Tarpon Springs Enterprise Association.

In 1937, a plot of land was donated by John and Mabel Cheyney to build a new library on what later became known as Library Lane. Groundbreaking for this building began in July 1938. The library was located here until 1964 when a new library building opened in Coburn Park. The library was housed in this building until the current library building, located at 138 East Lemon St. Tarpon Springs, FL 34689, opened in January 1997.

The current Tarpon Springs Public Library building is 20,000 square feet and is located in the downtown area of Tarpon Springs. The front of the building is adorned with a fountain showcasing two life size Tarpons springing forth from the water in celebration of the city's namesake. The building entrance is decorated with Mediterranean green marble which was also used to create both the Circulation and Reference desks.

Tarpon Springs Library is a member of the Pinellas Public Library Cooperative. It offers Pinellas County residents access to its wide collection, free computer use, as well as one-on-one Genealogy assistance.

== Media ==
Tarpon Springs is the setting and primary filming location of the 1953 film Beneath the Twelve-Mile Reef which follows the lives of a family of Greek sponge fishermen and depicts the annual Epiphany celebration.

== Infrastructure ==
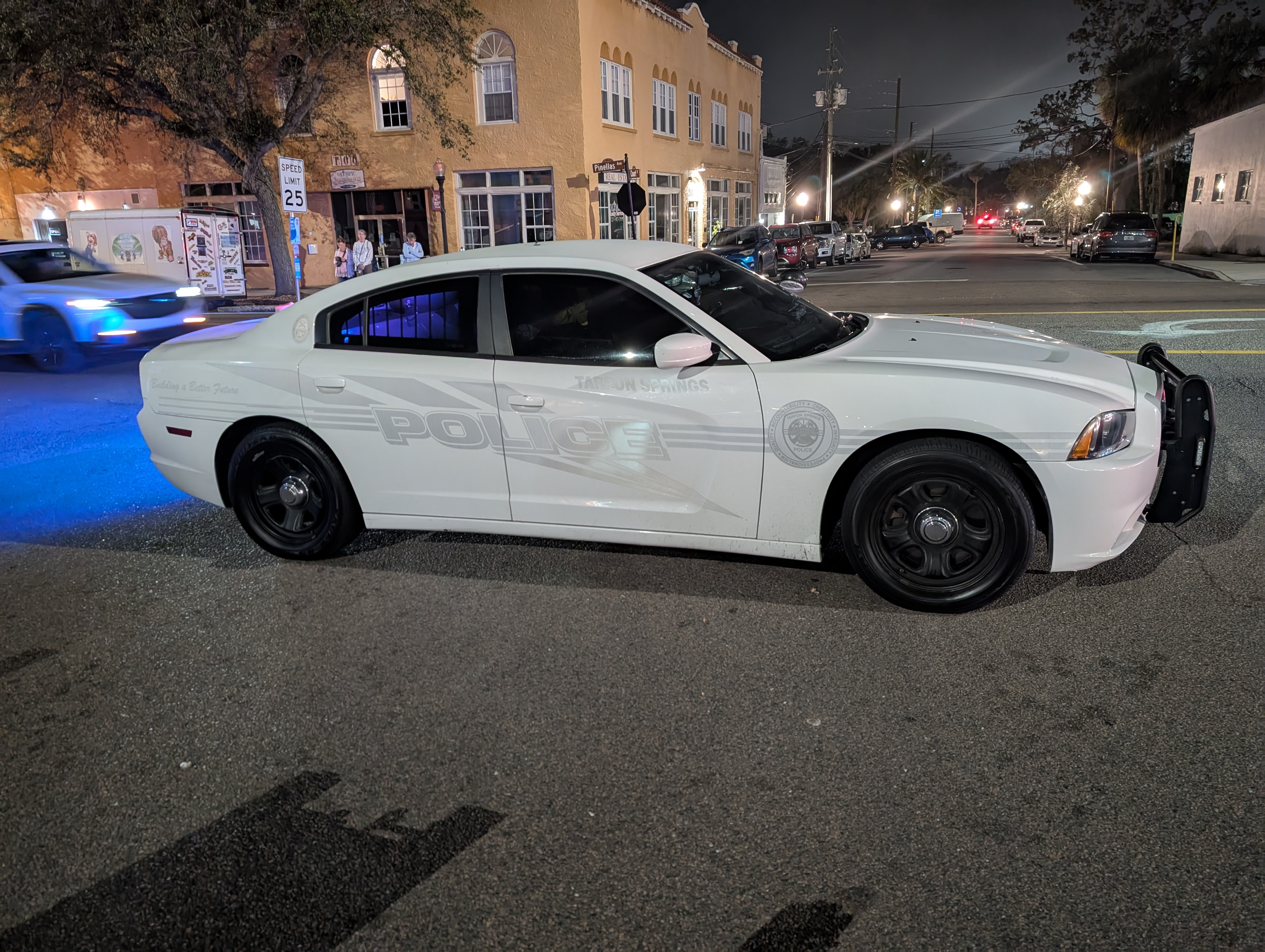
Tarpon Springs Police Department police car with ghost markings

Tarpon Springs Police Department has 57 total police officers, with 32 assigned to patrol.

AdventHealth North Pinellas is a hospital in Tarpon Springs.

== Notable people ==
- Doug Ault, professional baseball player
- Michael Bilirakis, former U.S. Representative
- Gus Bilirakis, U.S. Representative
- Wesley Charpie, soccer player
- Chris Coghlan, professional baseball player
- Mason Cole, professional football player
- Dieselboy, electronic music artist
- Athena Dion, drag queen
- Billy "The Kid" Emerson, preacher and former rock and roll pianist and songwriter
- Michael Koulianos, preacher, writer and YouTuber
- Elaine Esposito, former record holder of the longest coma
- Wayne Fontes, NFL coach for the Detroit Lions
- Bertie Higgins, singer of "Key Largo"
- William W. Kingsbury, United States House of Representatives
- Themistocles Leftheris, 2006 Olympian (with Naomi Nari Nam) in pairs figure skating
- Lois Lenski, Newbery Medal-winning children's author
- Bertram Chapman Mayo (1865–1920), American newspaper promoter
- Melanie Safka, singer-songwriter
- Savatage, heavy metal band and precursor to Trans-Siberian Orchestra
- Artavis Scott, wide receivers coach for the Clemson Tigers
- Nicholas Stewart, famous streamer known as Jynxzi
- 2 Pistols, rapper

== Sister cities ==
In 2007 and 2008, the Tarpon Springs established sister city relationships with Kalymnos, Halki, Symi, Hydra, and Larnaca, Cyprus, recognizing the historical link with those Greek-speaking islands.

== See also ==
- Greek diaspora
- Greektown
- Tarpon Springs High School
- Pinellas Trail
