= Harbor Oaks Residential District =

Historic district in Florida, United States

- U.S. National Register of Historic Places
- U.S. Historic district
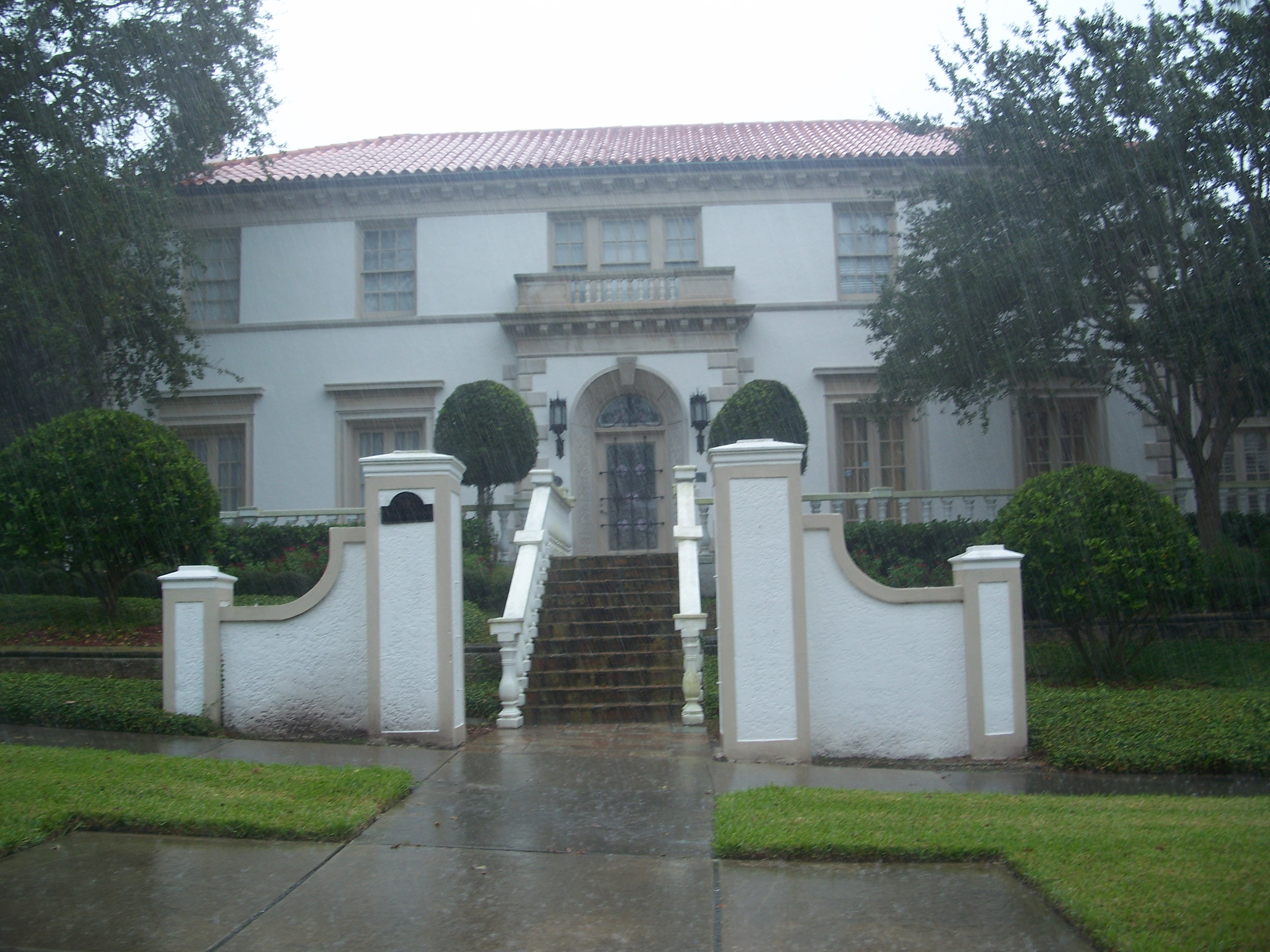
- A house within the Harbor Oaks Residential District

- Location within Florida Location within the United States
- Location: Clearwater, Florida
- Coordinates: 27°57′21″N 82°48′11″W
- Area: 400 acres (1.6 km^{2})
- NRHP reference No.: 87002133
- Added to NRHP: March 15, 1988

The Harbor Oaks Residential District – also known as Harbor Oaks Subdivision or simply Harbor Oaks – is a U.S. historic district located within the City of Clearwater, in Pinellas County, Florida. Containing 81 historic buildings and 6 objects, the district is bounded by Druid Road, South Fort Harrison Avenue, Lotus Path, and Clearwater Harbor.

== Description ==
The Harbor Oaks neighborhood was developed in the early 20th century by developer Dean Alvord. The historic district was listed on the National Register of Historic Places as a U.S. historic district on March 15, 1988.

== Notable properties ==
- Donald Roebling Estate

== Notable residents ==
- Rex Beach – Writer and polo player
- Charles Ebbets – Owner of the Brooklyn Dodgers
- Robert H. Ingersoll – Busienssman
- Donald Roebling – Engineer and inventor

== See also ==
- Belle Terre, New York
- Prospect Park South, Brooklyn
- Roslyn Estates, New York
