= Murder of Mark Fisher =

2003 murder in Brooklyn, New York, United States

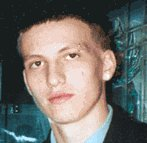
John Giuca, one of two men convicted of Fisher's murder

The murder of Mark Fisher occurred in the early morning hours of October 12, 2003, when the 19-year-old college student was beaten, shot five times, and left on Argyle Road in Prospect Park South, Brooklyn.

On October 19, 2005, co-defendants Antonio Russo and John Giuca were convicted of second-degree felony murder for Fisher's death and sentenced to 25 years to life for his murder.

== Mark S. Fisher ==
Mark S. Fisher was from Andover, New Jersey. He was the son of Michael and Nancy Fisher and brother to Alexis Fisher. He was a Lenape Valley Regional High School football star and Fairfield University sophomore. He was studying to be an accountant, and was on the Dean's List. Fisher was a National Honor Society student and a star athlete.

== Prior events ==
On October 11, 2003, Fisher was out drinking with three friends in Manhattan. By chance, Fisher ran into fellow Fairfield University student, Angel DiPietro. Fisher and one of DiPietro’s friends began hitting it off.

That evening, DiPietro met up with another friend of hers, Albert Cleary. Cleary joined the group with 20-year-old John Giuca. Giuca, unable to gain admission to the bar, invited the group to his house in Brooklyn for an impromptu after hours party. Fisher left his friends behind and taxied with the girls to Giuca's home. A number of Giuca’s friends also joined, including 17-year-old Antonio Russo. According to witness testimony, Fisher sat on a table in the house, which upset Giuca. Giuca claimed he last saw Fisher around 5 a.m., falling asleep sitting on his sofa under a yellow blanket.

At 5:23 a.m., Fisher withdrew $20 from a nearby ATM.

== Shooting ==
At 6:40 a.m., police responded to gunfire reports and within minutes found Fisher's body face down at the foot of a driveway on nearby Argyle Road. Fisher had been badly beaten and shot five times in the chest, side and back, was wearing a torn shirt with buttons missing, had $12 in cash in his pocket (his wallet was discovered in a nearby sewer), and was wrapped in a bloody yellow blanket from Giuca's home. The police recovered two .22 caliber shell casings at the scene.

Prior to the murder, Russo and Giuca did not have much telephone contact. In the 24 hours afterward, there were 26 phone calls between the two. According to police records, Russo cut his long worn dreadlocks and a few days later he flew to California.

== Arrest and indictment ==
=== Antonio Russo ===
Russo was arrested at his home on November 23, 2004, 13 months after Fisher's murder. Russo was indicted on two counts of second degree murder, three counts of robbery, and weapons charges.

=== John Giuca ===
Giuca was arrested on December 21, 2004, at his home in Brooklyn. He was charged with providing Fisher's murder weapon, a semiautomatic handgun, to Russo. At the time of his arrest, Giuca had been at the center of the investigation. A party Giuca held at his home was the last place Fisher was known to have been before he was shot five times.

Giuca had previously been arrested in July 2004 for assault, accused of having shot at a group of men in Florida while he was on vacation; the charges were later dropped. On September 30, 2004, three months before his felony indictment, Giuca was arrested on a Bensonhurst, Brooklyn, street corner for selling narcotics while wearing a bulletproof vest.

Giuca was subsequently charged with second-degree murder, first-degree manslaughter, robbery in the first and third degrees, and multiple counts of criminal possession of a weapon.

== 2004 homicide trial ==
Giuca and Russo were tried together as co-defendants in September 2005, but with two separate juries.

The prosecution argued that Giuca and Russo, members of a street gang dubbed "Ghetto Mafia", beat and shot Fisher on October 12, 2003, out of machismo, a need for street credibility, and because Fisher was a rich kid who made an easy target.

The government presented evidence of Giuca's involvement as a captain in the neighborhood street gang. Testimony showed that the Ghetto Mafia had recently put in place a policy that members would have to kill someone to join and that Giuca had been showing off a .22-caliber Ruger pistol a week before the murder. Giuca’s best friend, Albert Cleary, testified that before the shooting, Giuca worried that his crew was "getting soft” and needed to "get a body.”

Witnesses, including Giuca’s girlfriend at the time, testified to Giuca’s involvement in the murder, including providing the gun to Russo. Cleary testified that within hours of the shooting, Giuca told him he had led Fisher out to the street toward Russo, who was waiting with a gun, around dawn. Cleary also testified that Giuca told him Russo had attacked Fisher, but that the 19-year-old who stood 6' 5", fought back and Russo had shot Fisher with a .22-caliber Ruger pistol. Russo then returned the gun to Giuca, saying, "It's done." Giuca then asked Cleary to get rid of the weapon.

Russo claimed in his trial that Giuca was the person who fired the shots and killed Fisher.

The government also called as a witness Giuca's former cellmate John Avitto, who testified that while imprisoned at Rikers Island he had overheard Giuca confess to the murder. He testified he overheard Giuca confess in a conversation with his father; however Giuca's father was unable to speak after suffering a stroke years earlier.

== Verdict and sentencing ==
In October 2005, two years after Fisher's murder, Giuca and Russo were sentenced to 25 years to life. The judge said: "This was a callous crime, and the defendants’ reactions were callous—brutal, callous, and shockingly senseless. So my sentence will be callous."

=== Antonio Russo ===
Russo's jury deliberated for two days before finding him guilty.

=== John Giuca ===
After two hours of deliberation, the Brooklyn jury found Giuca guilty on charges of second-degree murder, robbery, and multiple counts of criminal possession of a firearm. Giuca was imprisoned on Rikers Island.

== Appeals ==
=== 2008–2015 ===
In 2008, Giuca filed his first motion to vacate the verdict in New York State Supreme Court in Brooklyn arguing that he did not receive a fair trial due to juror misconduct. The court denied Giuca's motion. He appealed the decision. The New York Appellate Division 2nd Department denied the request for a hearing to review evidence of juror misconduct against former juror Jason Allo.

In November 2010, a panel of four state Supreme Court judges ruled that even if the alleged statements the juror Jason Allo had made were true, there were no grounds for overturning his conviction.

On May 14, 2013, Judge Frederic Block of the United States District Court for the Eastern District of New York denied Giuca's federal habeas petition.

In February 2014, Giuca's attorney submitted a petition to the newly elected Brooklyn District Attorney, Kenneth P. Thompson, requesting that the conviction be reviewed and voided due to prosecutorial misconduct, a failure by the defense lawyer at trial to point out multiple inconsistencies, and recantation of testimony by key witnesses. In January 2015, Thompson, who established the Conviction Review Unit in NYC, announced that after a thorough review, the department determined there was no wrongdoing in the case: "I have determined that John Giuca's conviction for the murder of Mark Fisher is just and should not be vacated." He added: "This defendant got a fair trial. He may not like the result, but the result was based on the evidence presented. There’s no evidence of actual innocence."

=== 2016–2018 ===
On June 9, 2016, Giuca filed his second motion to vacate the verdict. After a hearing Brooklyn Supreme Court Justice Danny Chun denied the motion on June 13. The judge ruled that Giuca had received a fair trial. Giuca's attorney stated that he would appeal the verdict.

On February 7, 2018, a four-judge panel of the New York State Second Judicial Department Appeals Court in Brooklyn unanimously overturned Giuca's conviction and ordered a new trial. It ruled that the district attorney's office had withheld evidence from the defense. On February 20, June 28, and September 6, 2018, Giuca was denied bail.

On March 22, 2018, Russo confessed to killing Fisher. In a statement passed to Giuca's lawyer, Russo told detectives that he had murdered Fisher and that the gun was his.

On June 28, 2018, New York's highest court announced it would hear Giuca's case, with oral arguments scheduled for April 30, 2019.

On June 11, 2019, the New York Court of Appeals overturned the appeals court decision, and reinstated Giuca's murder conviction. Chief Judge of the State of New York Janet DiFiore, who wrote for the majority, disagreed with the lower court in Brooklyn that information never turned over to the defense about favors the prosecution had done for a key witness would have changed the course of the trial, "there is no reasonable possibility that the verdict would have been different if the information at issue had been disclosed."

=== 2019–present ===
On August 6, 2019, Giuca's legal team filed a third motion to vacate his conviction based on new evidence. A hearing for these claims was scheduled for January 2021.

== Support ==
Looking for evidence to overturn her son's conviction, Doreen Giuliano began an unsanctioned inquiry of the jurors targeting juror Jason Allo. Using the alias Dee Quinn, Giuliano rented an apartment close to Allo's residence, transformed her appearance, and established a close relationship with him. Giuliano recorded her conversations and submitted audio of Allo making antisemitic comments about Giuca to the State Supreme Court in an appeal of Giuca's conviction. Giuliano's conduct was condemned by Judge Alan Marrus. Giuliano's crusade to free her son attracted widespread attention from media outlets and the nickname "Mother Justice".
