= Donald Roebling Estate =

Historic residential estate in Clearwater, within Pinellas County, FL

- U.S. National Register of Historic Places
- U.S. Historic district – Contributing property
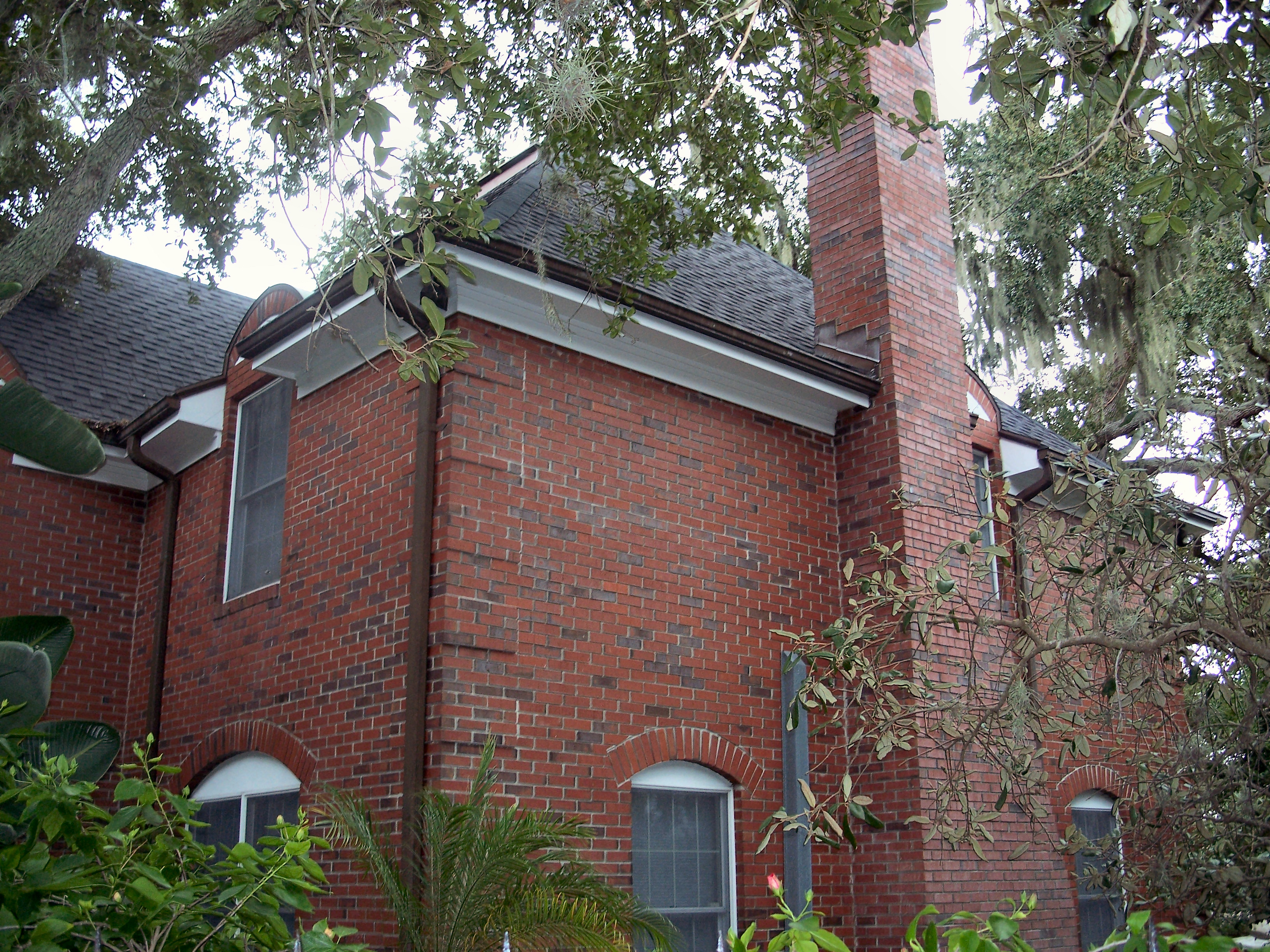
- Spottiswoode residence facade

- Location within Florida Location within the United States
- Location: Clearwater, Pinellas County, Florida
- Coordinates: 27°57′27″N 82°48′17″W
- Built: 1929
- Architect: John Phillipoff & Roy W. Wakeling
- Architectural style: Tudor Revival
- NRHP reference No.: 79000689
- Added to NRHP: December 19, 1979

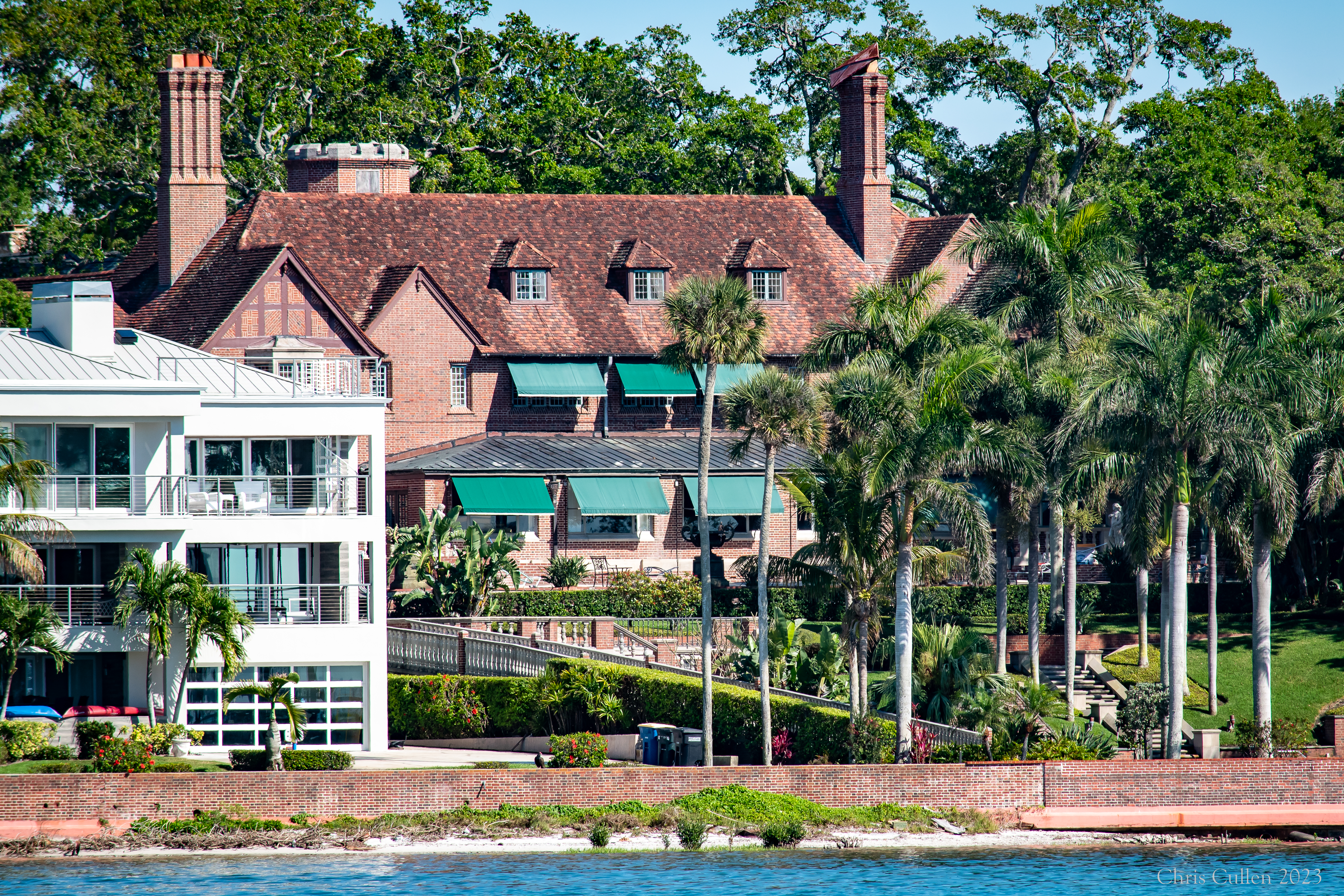
View of Donald Roebling Estate from Clearwater Bay

The Donald Roebling Estate, also known as Spottiswoode and Spotswood, is a historic residential estate within the City of Clearwater, in Pinellas County on the West Coast of Florida, United States.

== History ==
It was the home of inventor, engineer, industrial designer, and philanthropist Donald Roebling (1908–1959). It is located on the channel at 700 Spottiswoode Lane in Clearwater. Roebling bought and named the parcel of land Spottiswoode, in honor of his fiancée, Florence Spotswood Parker.

Donald Roebling was the great-grandson of John Augustus Roebling who designed the Brooklyn Bridge, and grandson of Washington Roebling who was in charge of the bridge's construction.

The buildings were designed in the Tudor Revival style by architects Roy W. Wakeling and John Phillipoff, and the residence was completed in 1929. The estate includes the mansion, a boathouse on the Intracoastal Waterway, an 'engineering−inventions' machine shop, and other outbuildings.

=== Harbor Oaks ===
The estate was built in the Harbor Oaks Residential District, Clearwater's first planned residential development, that was opened in 1914 by Dean Alvord, a major developer from New York. The development offered then-innovative features such as paved streets, curbs, and sidewalks, underground utility and sewer systems, and tree lined parkways. Other original Harbor Oaks residents included author Rex Beach, Brooklyn Dodgers owner Charles Ebbets, industrialist Robert Ingersoll, and members of the Studebaker, Proctor, and Gamble families.

=== Landmark designation ===
On December 19, 1979, the Donald Roebling Estate was added to the US National Register of Historic Places.

The estate is also protected within the Harbor Oaks Historic District, established the following decade.

== Gallery ==
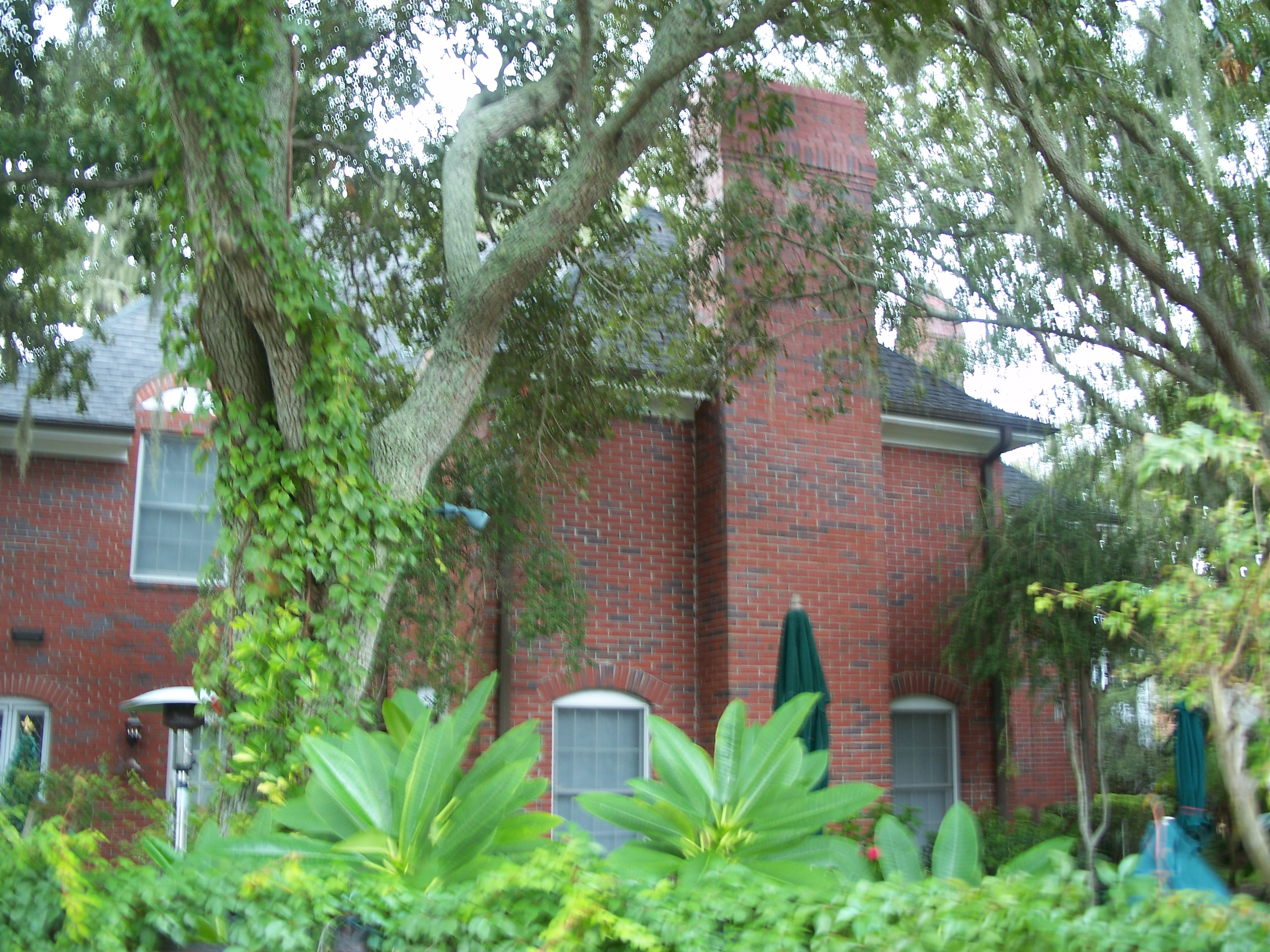
Spottiswoode residence and garden.

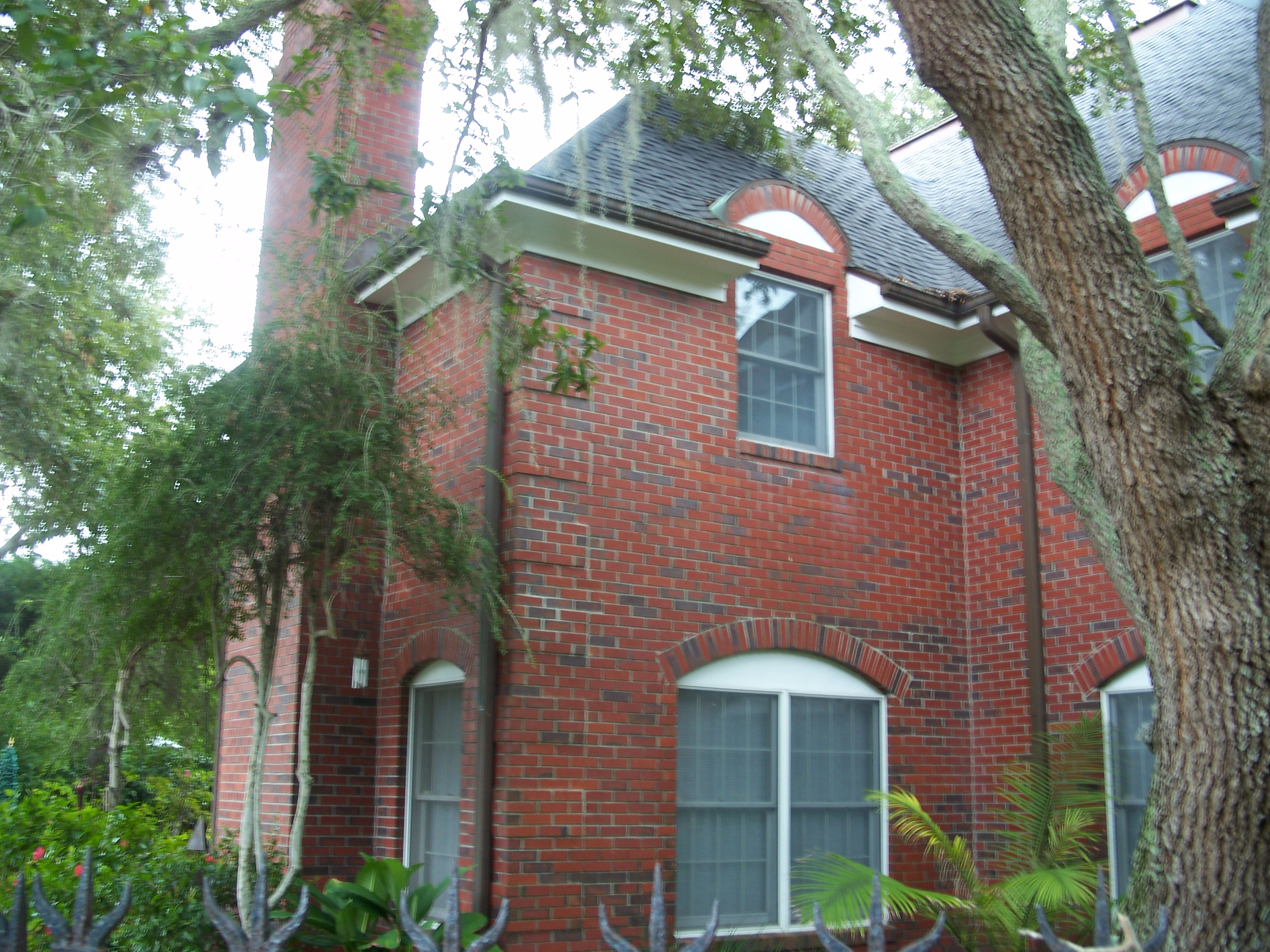
Tudor Revival brick facade and window details

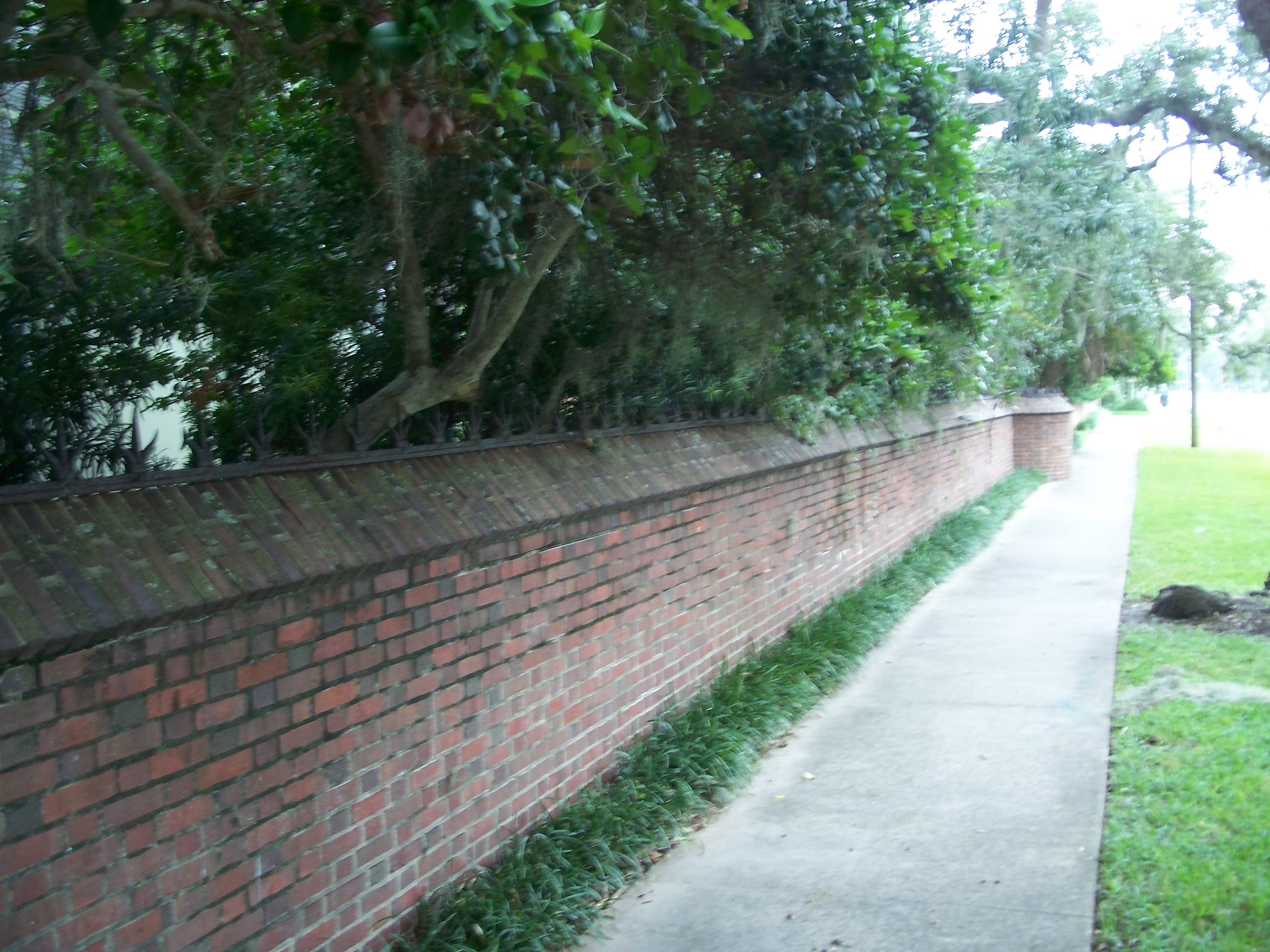
Stone garden wall along sidewalk.
