= Prospect Park South =

Historic district in Brooklyn, New York

- Prospect Park South Historic District
- U.S. National Register of Historic Places
- U.S. Historic district
- New York State Register of Historic Places
- New York City Landmark
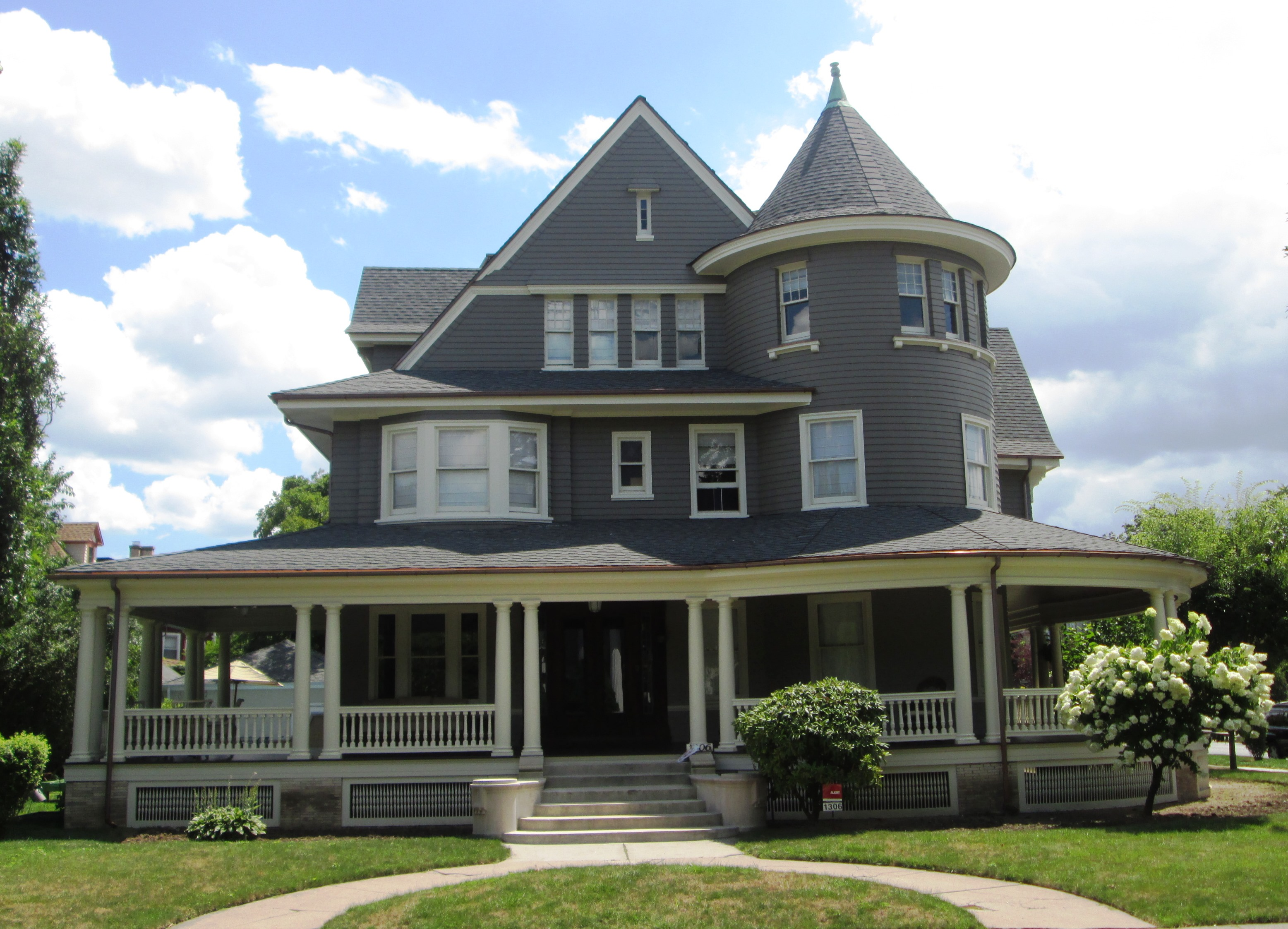
- John S. Eakins House (1905) at 1306 Albemarle Road
- Location: Roughly bounded by BMT Brighton Line, Beverley Rd., and Coney Island and Church Aves. Brooklyn, New York City
- Coordinates: 40.646111°N 73.967222°W
- Area: 47 acres (19 ha)
- Built: 1899
- Architect: multiple
- Architectural style: multiple
- NRHP reference No.: 83001699
- NYCL No.: 0979

Significant dates
- Added to NRHP: July 21, 1983
- Designated NYSRHP: June 13, 1983
- Designated NYCL: February 8, 1979

Prospect Park South is a small neighborhood in Flatbush, Brooklyn, New York City, located south of Prospect Park. It is included within the Prospect Park South Historic District, which was designated by the New York City Landmarks Preservation Commission in 1979 and listed on the National Register of Historic Places in 1983. The historic district is bounded by Church Avenue to the north, the BMT Brighton Line (B and Q trains) of the New York City Subway to the east, Beverley Road to the south, and between Stratford Road and Coney Island Avenue to the west.

Prospect Park South, along with other neighborhoods within Flatbush, is policed by the 70th Precinct of the New York City Police Department.

== History ==
In 1899, developer Dean Alvord purchased about 60 acres (24 ha) of farmland in order to create Prospect Park South, a community of substantial homes, a "rural park within the limitations of the conventional city block and city street." Alvord characterized the development as rus in urbe, the country in the city. The location was selected to take advantage of the train service on the Brooklyn and Brighton Beach Railroad of the Brooklyn Rapid Transit Company (BRT). The line, now known as the BMT Brighton Line, offered express and local train service that remains to this day. The trains emerged at Fulton Street as an elevated line and continued across the Brooklyn Bridge to Manhattan.

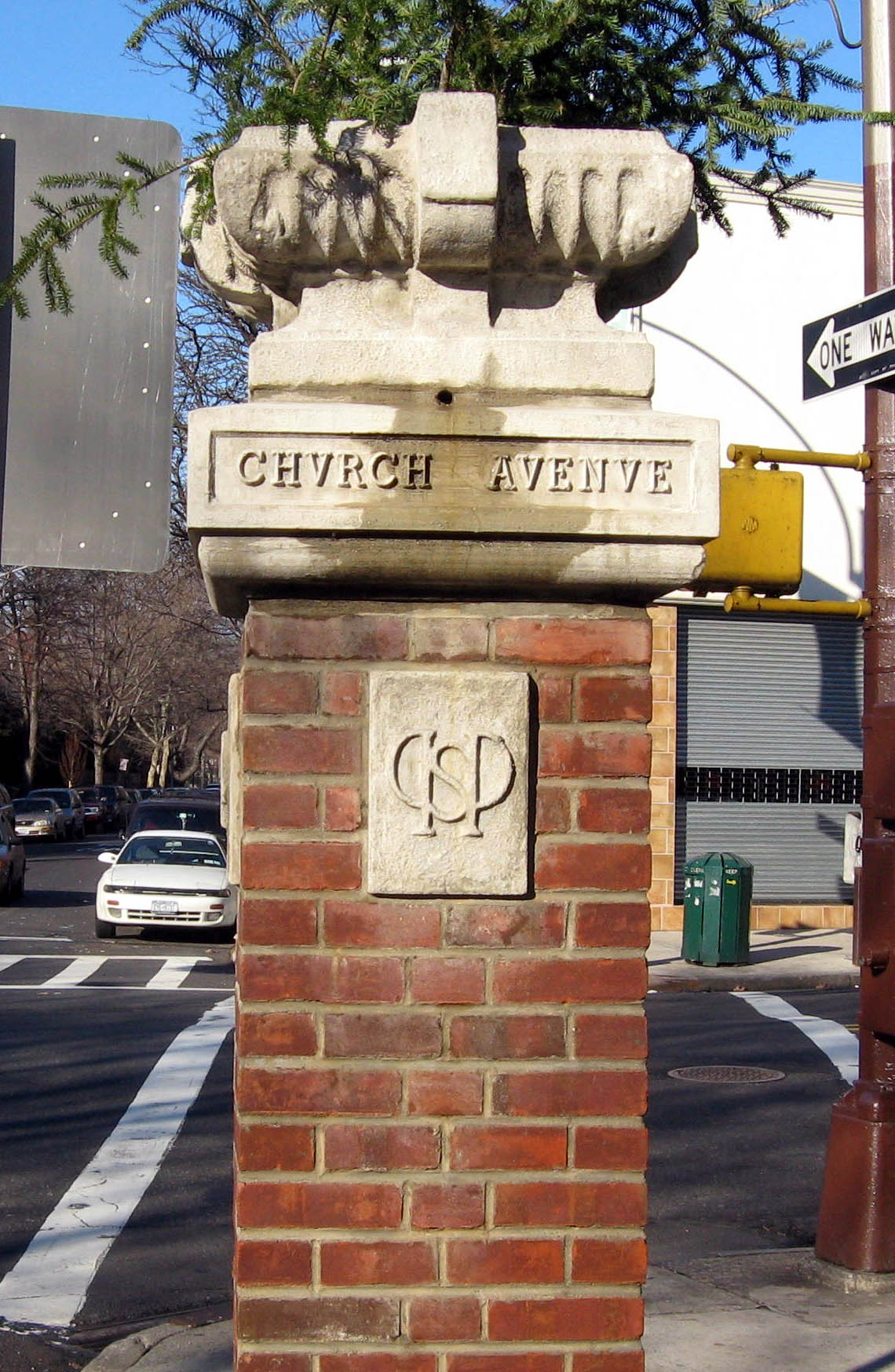
Gatepost at Church Avenue & Buckingham Road. Gateposts such as this mark many of the entrances to streets in the historic district.

Once he had purchased the land, Alvord laid out all the necessary utilities and marked the entrance of most streets with brick piers with cast concrete plaques bearing the bas-relief inscription "PPS". He also hired John Aitkin, a Scottish landscape gardener, to supervise the plantings for the lawns and the Flatbush Malls, with meticulous attention given to details. Trees, for instance, were not planted only along the curb line, but also at the building line as well, to give the streets greater breadth of vision, to block out adjoining houses, and provide the illusion that each house was the only one on the block. Both Norway maples and Carolina poplars were used: the poplars for immediate shade, and the slower-growing maples for long-term shade. Alvord did all this before selling a single plot.

Alvord also hired architect John J. Petit and a staff to design the houses in the development, although clients could also provide their own architect if they preferred to. Petit ended up designing many of the houses in the development, in a wide variety of styles, including Colonial Revival, Tudor Revival and Queen Anne. The houses in Prospect Park South were required to be substantial, freestanding homes exceeding 3,500 square feet (325 m^{2}) and costing over US$5,000. Several other restrictions were also placed upon builders wishing to develop the lots.

Alvord wanted to create an environment that attracted the Protestant, wealthy elite while excluding the immigrant population moving into Brooklyn at the time. In his original prospectus, Alvord wrote:

In fixing upon a location for a home, it is pleasant to live where children, in going to and fro, are not subject to the annoyance of contact with the undesirable elements of society. The Flatbush Avenue trolley line penetrates no slum sections and is patronized almost exclusively by people of intelligence and good breeding.

While not the first attempt at suburban development in the area, Alvord's vision excited the interest of the wealthy of Brooklyn Heights and Manhattan residents. Ultimately, Alvord's restrictions not only created an exciting new design but a standard to become a blueprint for the modern suburb. Enthusiasm for his design in following years would see South Midwood, Fiske Terrace, Ditmas Park, the Beverley Squares, and many more developments spring up in the surrounding area to accommodate the demand, together forming what is now known as Victorian Flatbush.

In 1972, New York's Albanian community established a mosque at 1325 Albemarle Road.

Prospect Park South was designated as a historic district by the New York City Landmarks Preservation Commission in 1979.

== Notable residents ==
- John Giuca (born 1983), convicted of second-degree felony murder
- Doreen Giuliano, mother of John Giuca, went undercover to investigate possible juror misconduct in his trial
- Maya Wiley (born 1964), lawyer, professor, civil rights activist, and 2021 mayoral candidate for New York City

== Notable houses ==
The Alvord Mansion at 1522 Albemarle Road was built by Alvord for his family. Later, it was purchased by Israel Matz, founder of the Ex-lax Company. The Alvord Mansion burned down c.1955 under mysterious conditions after its sale by the Matz family to apartment developers fell through in the face of community opposition.

Among the other notable houses in the neighborhood are:

- Herman Goetze House, 15 Stratford Road, 1905, Colonial Revival, George Hitchings
- Herbert Krantz House, 183 Argyle Road, 1904, Tudor Revival, John J. Petit
- George E. Gale House, 1305 Albemarle Road, 1905, Classical Revival, H. B. Moore
- John S. Eakins House, 1306 Albemarle Road, 1905, Shingle style/Colonial Revival, John J. Petit
- Col. Alexander S. Bacon House, 101 Rugby Road, Eclectic/Swiss chalet, 1900, John E. Nitchie
- Francis M Crafts House, 1423 Albemarle Road, 1899, Queen Anne, John J. Petit
- J. C. Woodhull House, 1440 Albemarle Road, 1905, Queen Anne/Colonial Revival, Robert Bryson and Carroll Pratt
- Henry P. Reade House, 1501 Albemarle Road, 1904, Queen Anne, John J. Petit
- Maurice Minton House, 1510 Albemarle Road, 1900, Colonial Revival, John J. Petit
- Louis McDonald House, 1519 Albemarle Road, 1902, Prairie School/Neo-Jacobean, John J. Petit
- Frank K. Schenck House, 219 Marlborough Road, 1900, John J. Petit
- Russell Benedict House, 104 Buckingham Road, 1902, Classical Revival, Carroll H. Pratt
- William H. McEntee House, 115 Buckingham Road, 1900, Shingle style, John J. Petit
- George U. Tompers House, 125 Buckingham Road, 1911, Colonial Revival, Brun & Hauser
- Frederick S. Kolle House, 131 Buckingham Road, 1902–03, Japanese pagoda, Petit & Green
- William A. Norwood House, 143 Buckingham Road, 1906, Italian Villa, Walter S. Cassin
- The Sovereign, 55 Parade Place, 1927, large residential complex across from the Brooklyn Parade Grounds

== Gallery ==
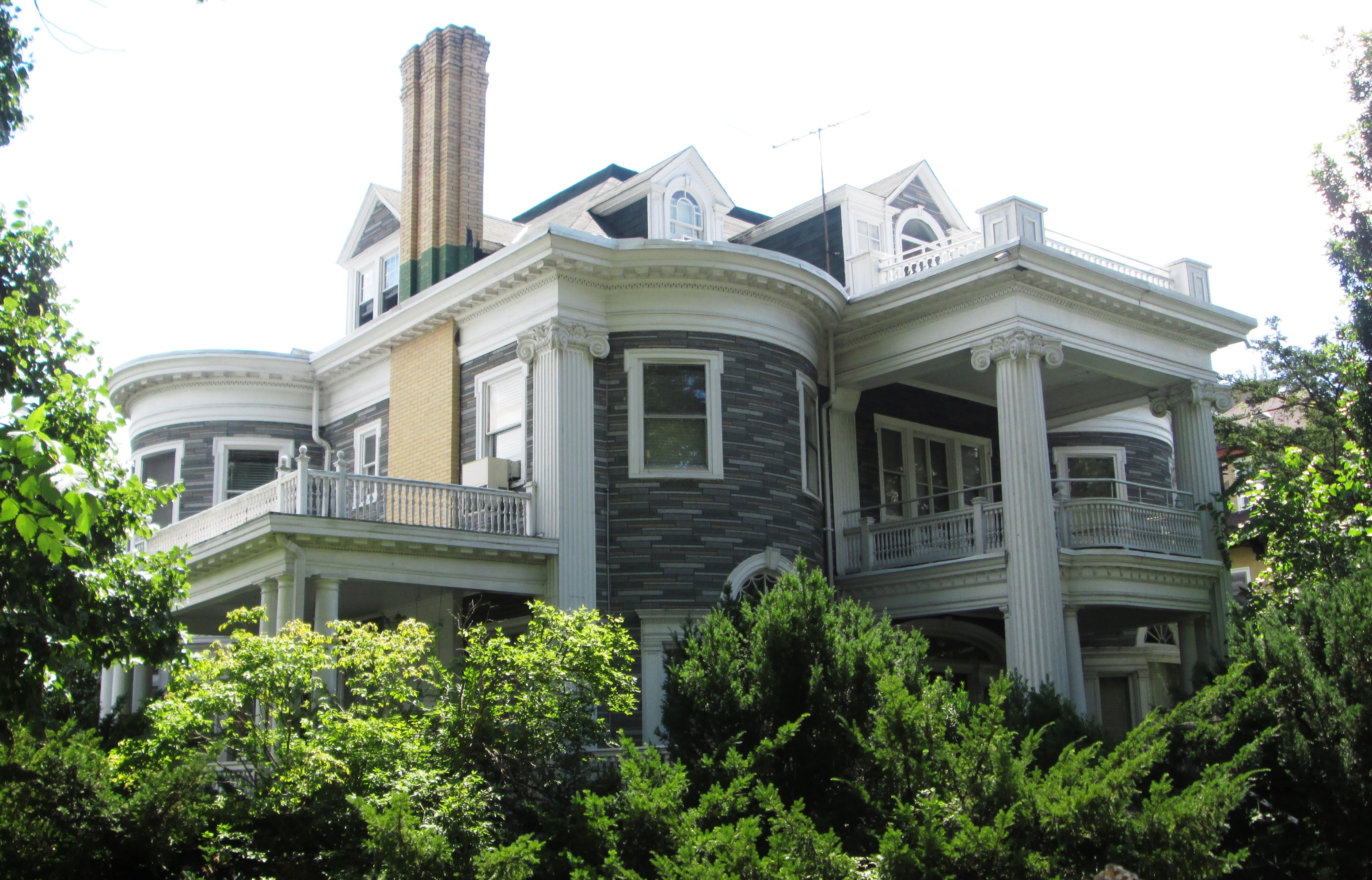
1440 Albemarle Road
(Bill Bryson & Carroll Pratt, 1905)

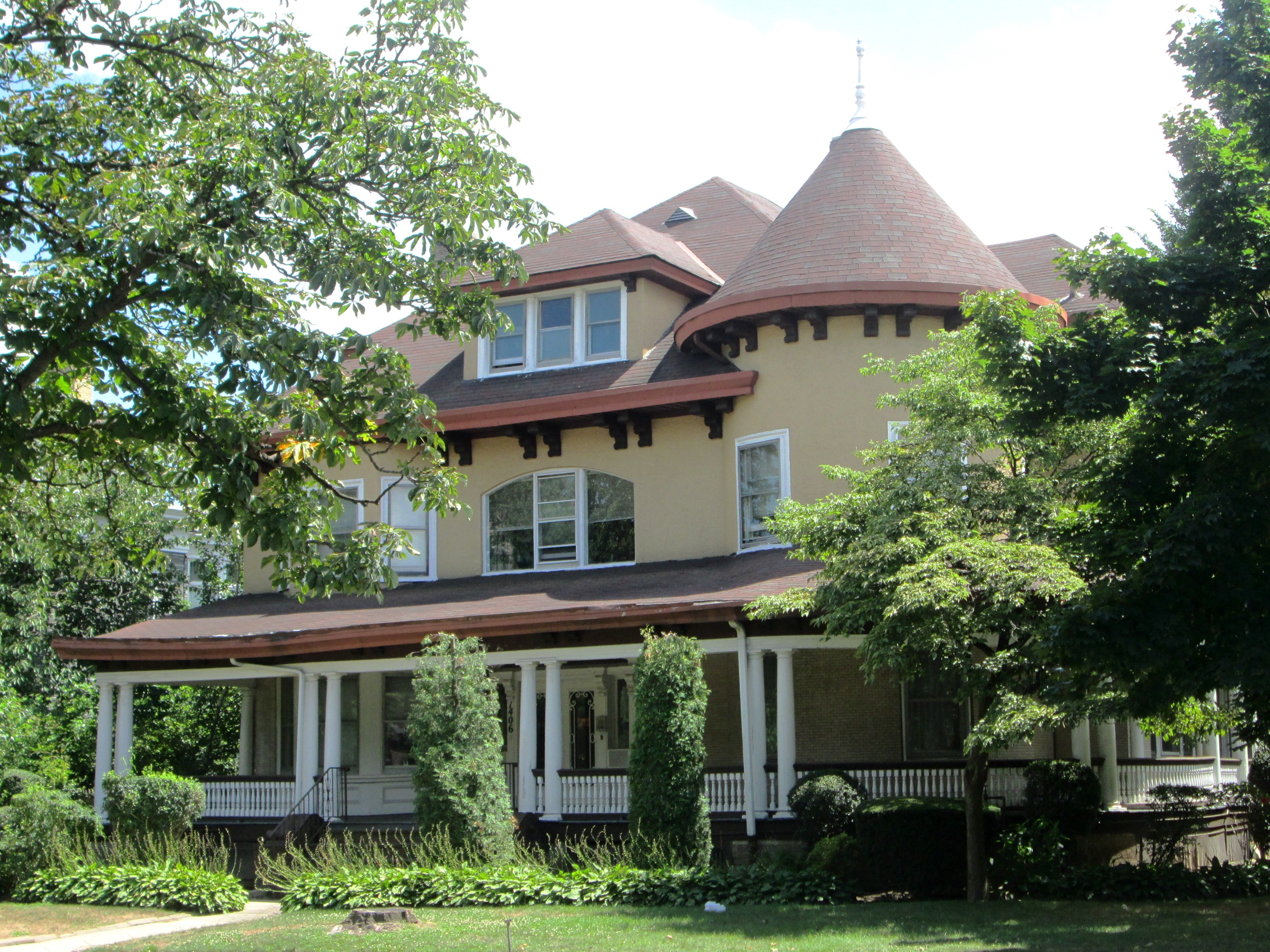
1314 Albemarle Road
(Carroll Pratt, 1903)

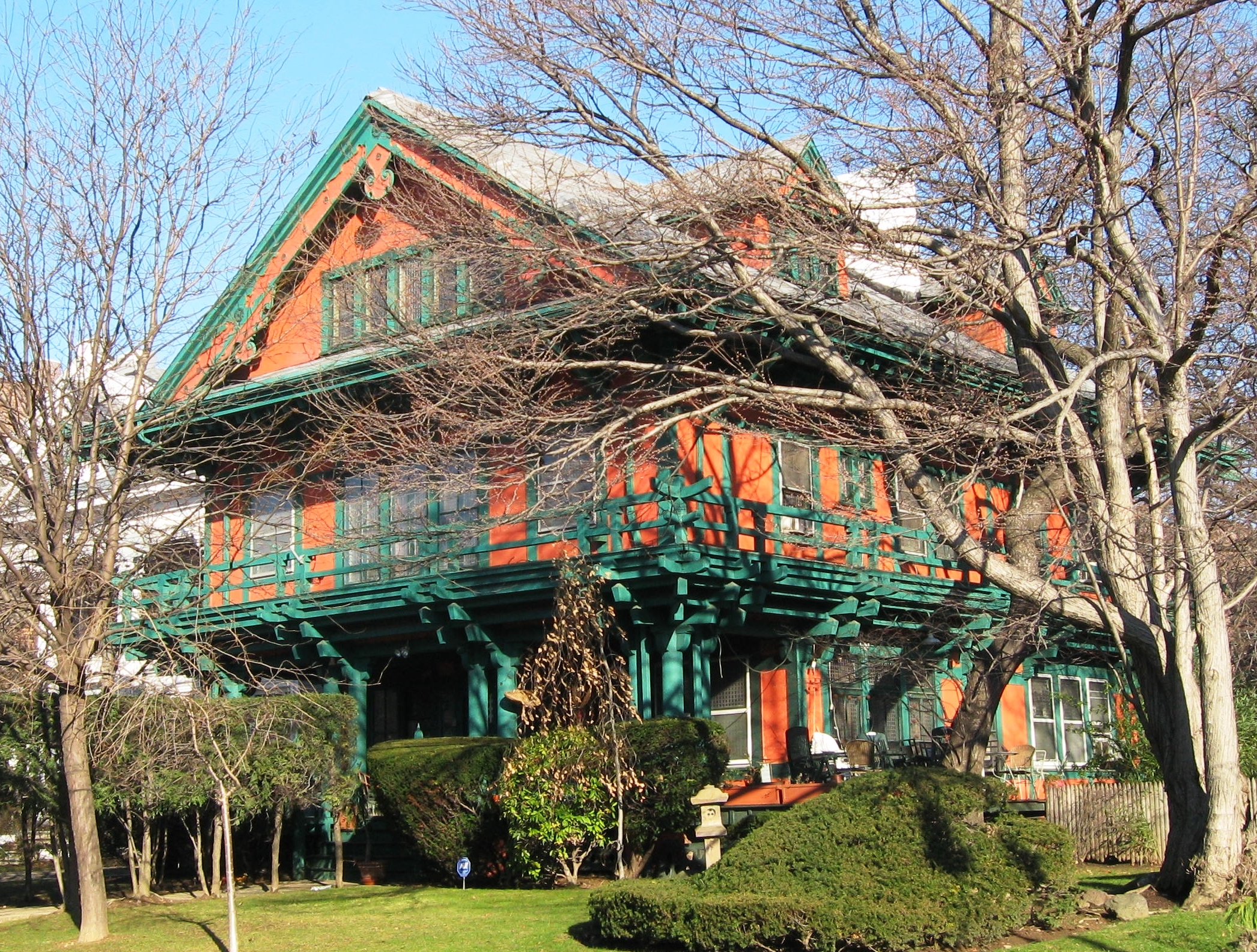
131 Buckingham Road
(Petit & Green, 1902–03)

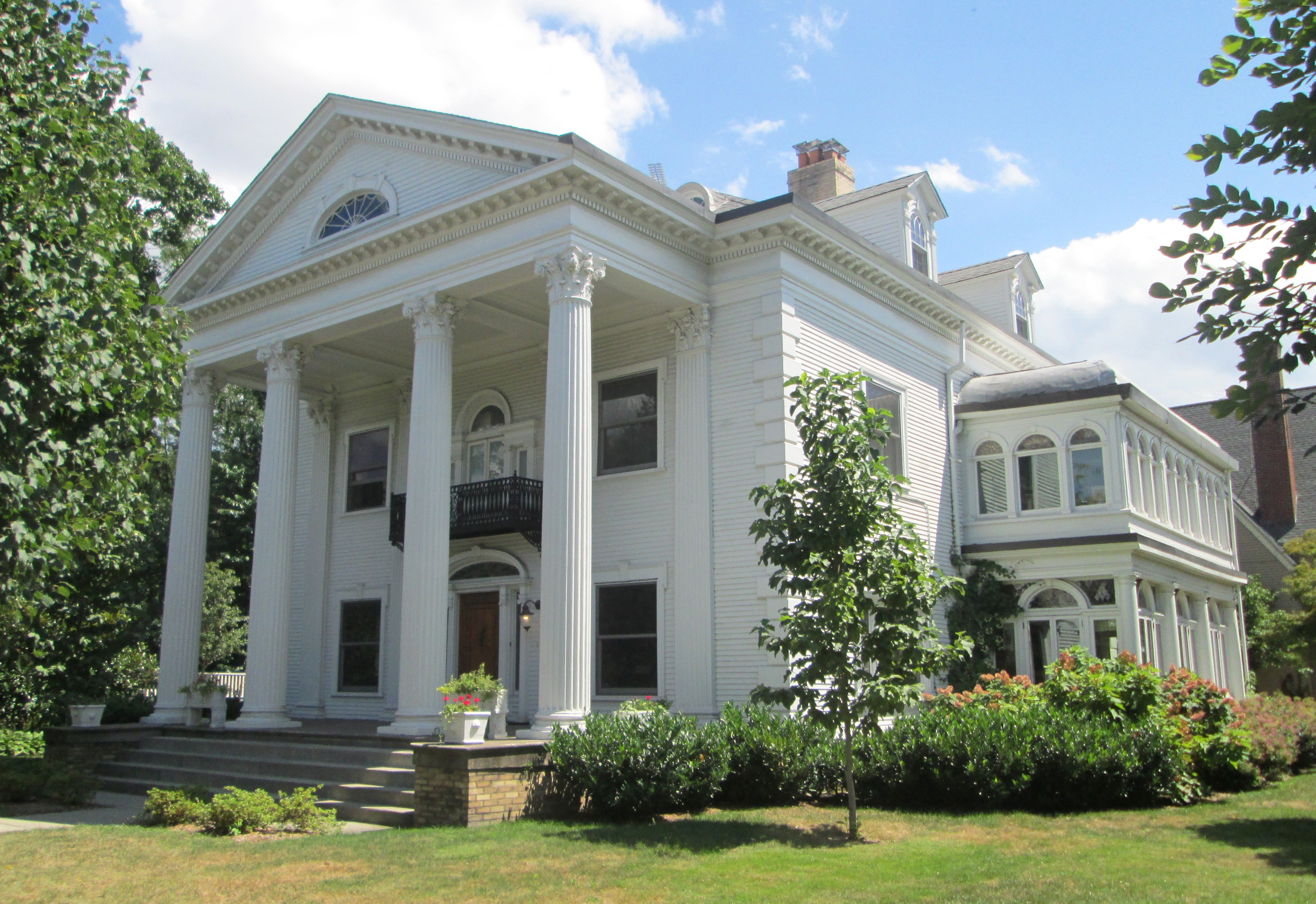
1510 Abermarle Road
(John J. Petit, 1900)

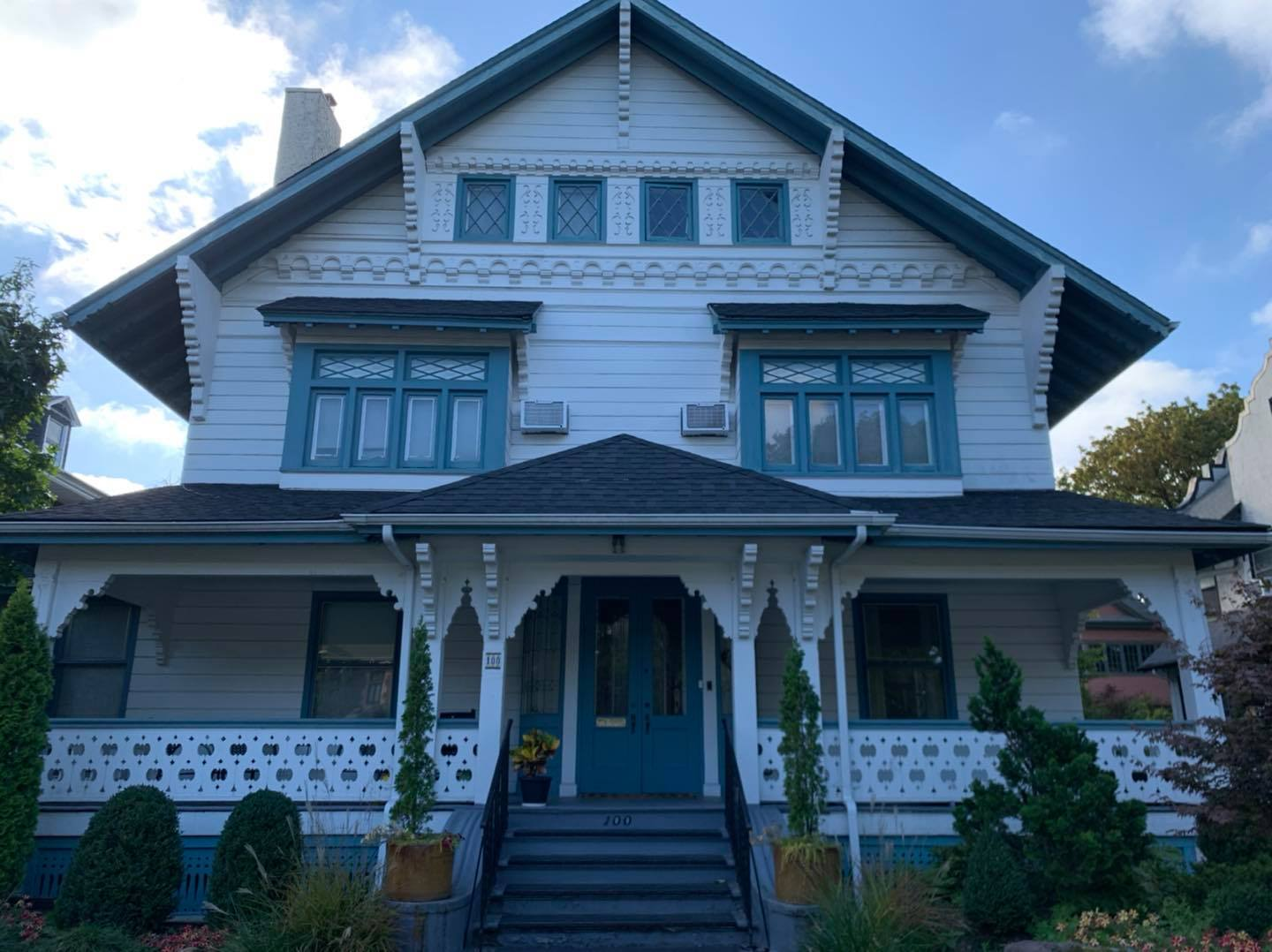
100 Rugby Road (John J. Petit, 1905)

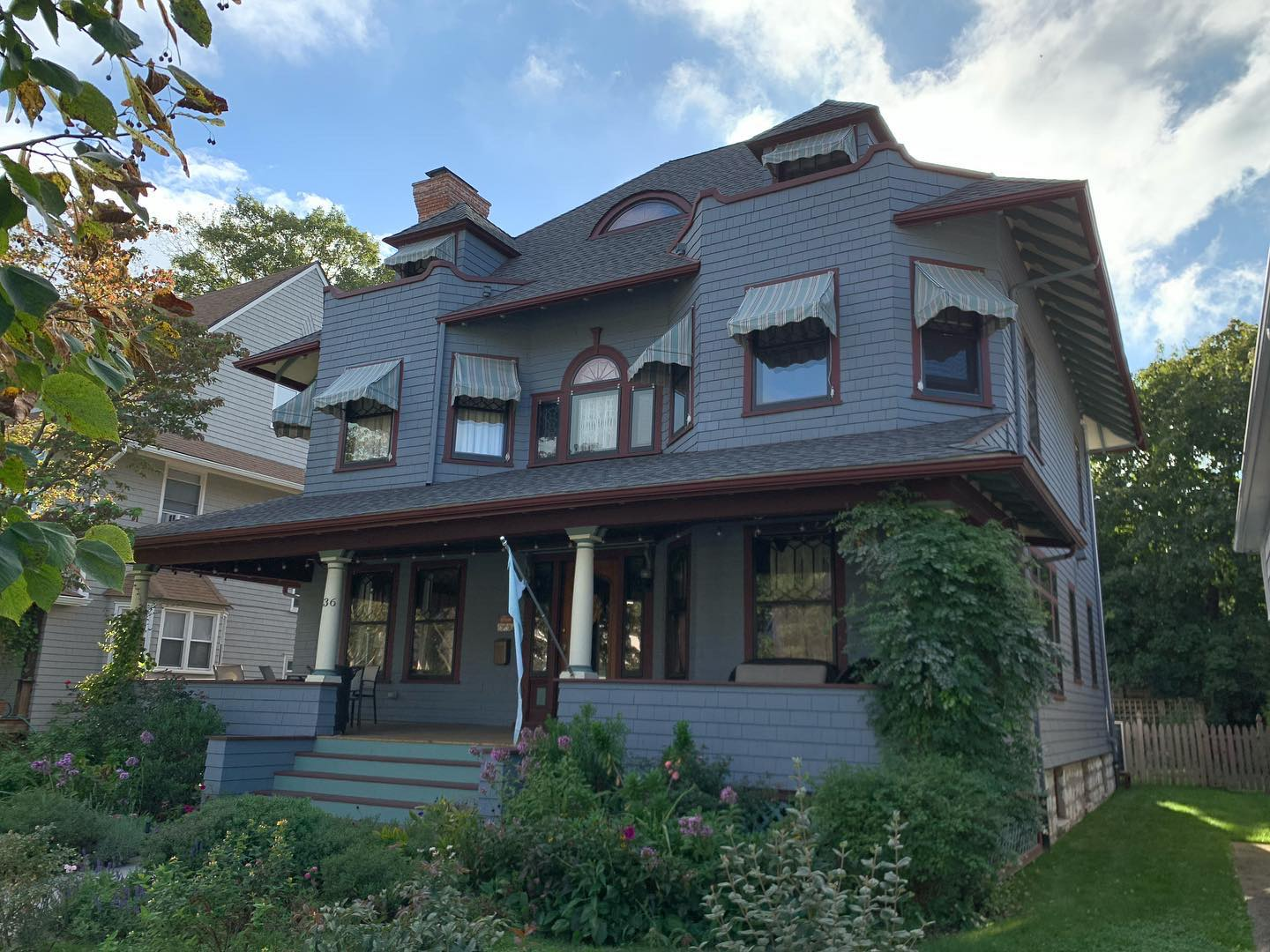
136 Argyle Road (Carroll Pratt, 1903)

== See also ==
- List of Brooklyn neighborhoods
- List of New York City Designated Landmarks in Brooklyn
