= Dean Alvord =

American real estate developer and college professor (1856–1941)

Dean Albert Alvord
- Born: December 4, 1856; Syracuse, New York
- Died: April 18, 1941 (aged 84); Tampa Hospital, Tampa, Florida
- Education: Syracuse University (graduated 1882)
- Occupations: Real estate developer, professor, philanthropist
- Spouse: Nellie Barnum
- Children: 4
- Relatives: Jonathan Edwards (maternal ancestor)

Dean Alvord (December 4, 1856 – April 18, 1941) was an American real estate developer, college professor, and philanthropist known for his real estate developments in the New York City Metropolitan Area and in Florida. He was a relative of both Jonathan Edwards and Aaron Burr.

== Life and career ==
Dean Alvord was born in Syracuse, New York, on December 4, 1856. He graduated from Syracuse University in 1882. He was a member of Syracuse University's Phi Gamma chapter of the Delta Kappa Epsilon fraternity.

Alvord eventually moved to Brooklyn in New York City in order to continue pursuing his career in real estate and development after initially starting his career in Rochester, New York, where he developed a successful neighborhood.

Around 1899, Alvord would purchase roughly 60 acres (24 ha) of farmland in Brooklyn and would soon develop it into a neighborhood called Prospect Park South. He chose the location in part to take advantage of the area's public transportation. Soon afterwards, Alvord developed the Laurelton section of Queens.

In the first decade of the 20th century, Alvord began developing the famed community of Belle Terre in Port Jefferson, New York, c. 1902–1903.

In 1905, Alvord purchased and developed a large area in Shinnecock Hills on the eastern end of Long Island. Following (and as a result of) this purchase, Alvord became the owner of roughly 10% of Long Island's shoreline.

Around 1908, Alvord began developing another well-known community, Roslyn Estates, New York, which was developed with winding roads and ponds.

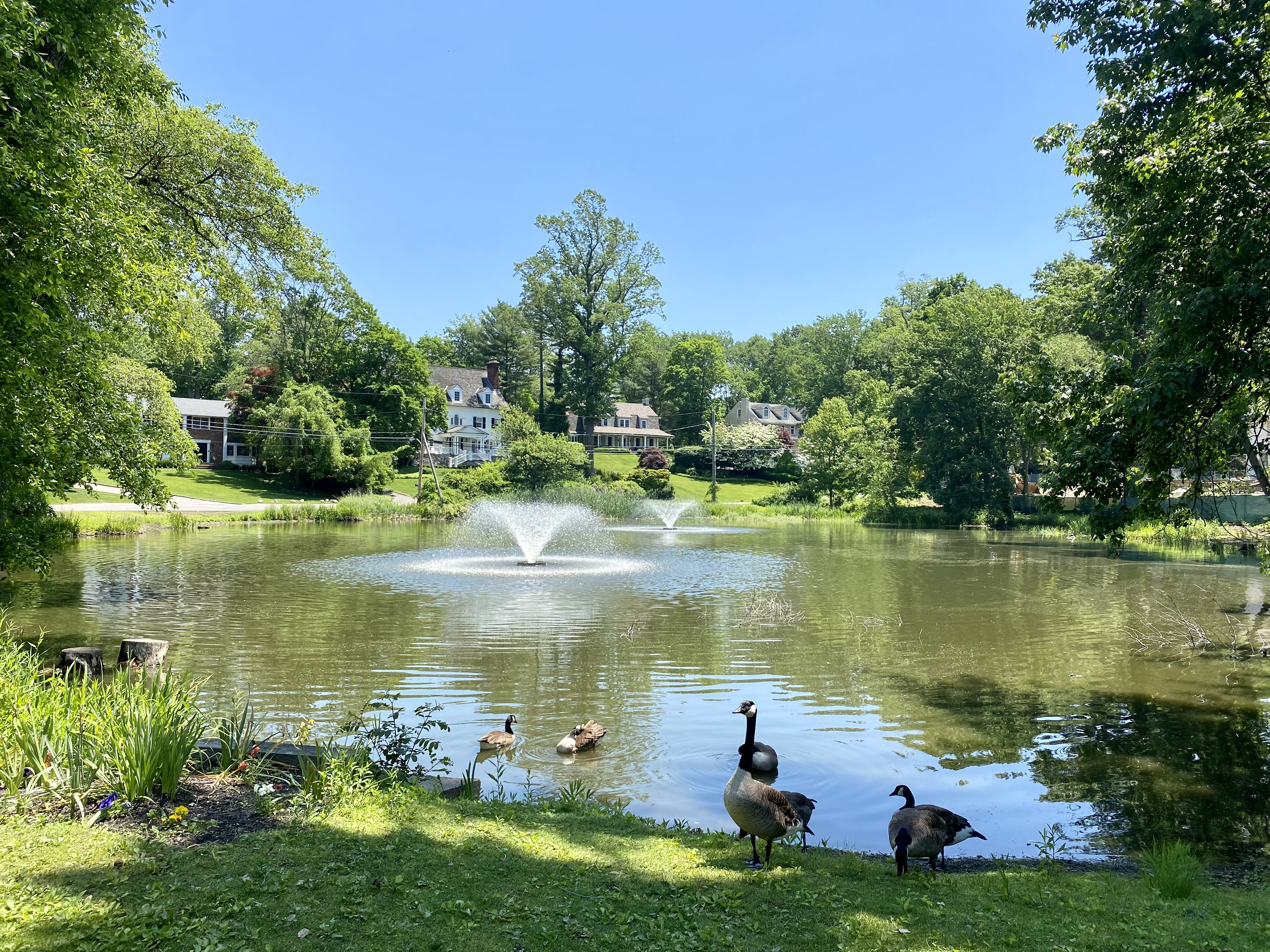
Black Ink Pond in Roslyn Estates, New York – one of Alvord's best-known developments.

Alvord's development corporation went into receivership around 1913.

Alvord moved to Clearwater, Florida, in 1913. He moved there intending to retire, but ultimately continued working as a developer; Alvord continued working as a developer until his death. It was during this time when he developed the Harbor Oaks subdivision of Clearwater, which he opened around 1914. The Harbor Oaks subdivision is now a historic district known as the Harbor Oaks Historic District and is listed on the National Register of Historic Places.

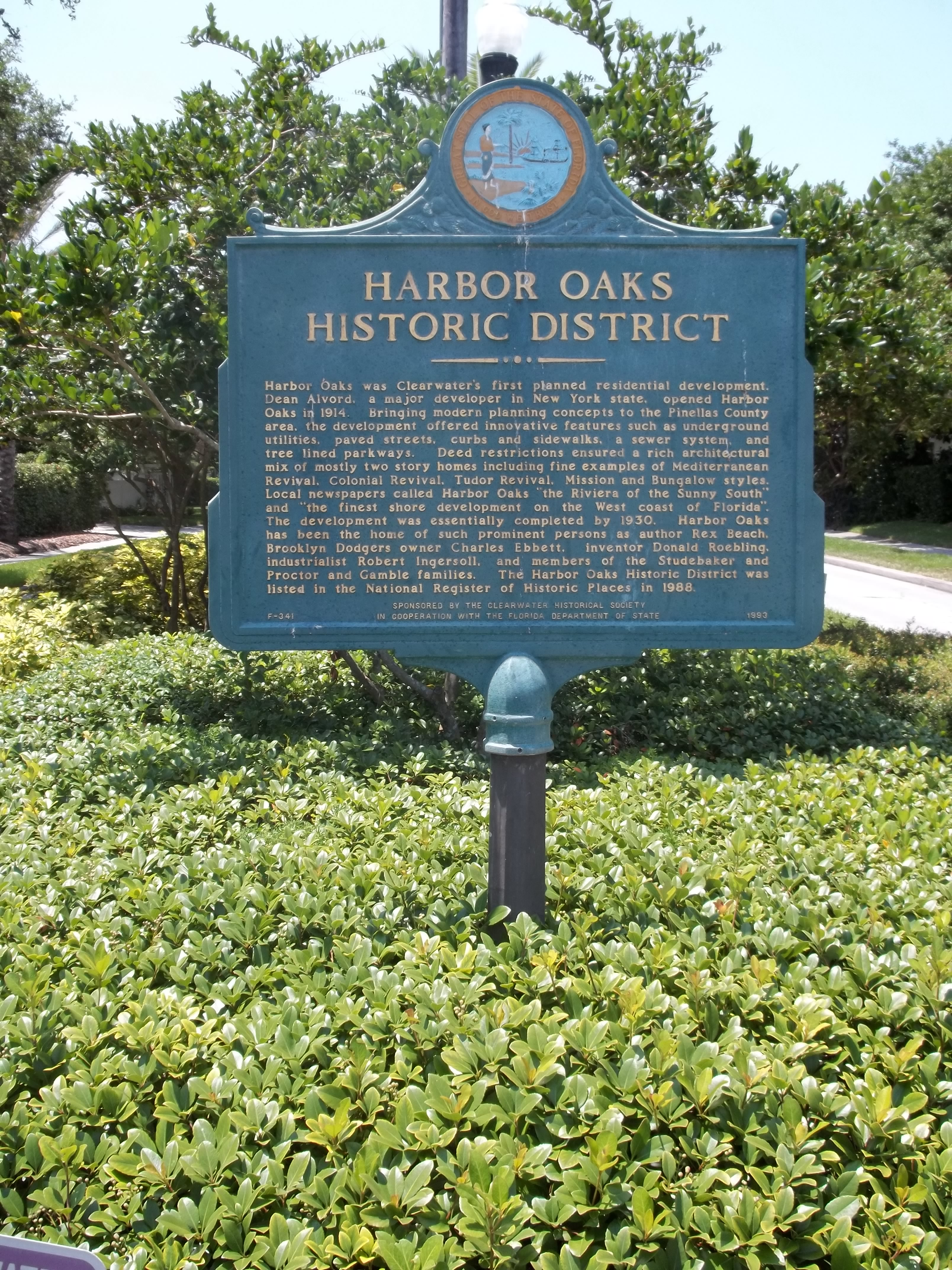
A sign in Harbor Oaks explaining the neighborhood's history.

Alvord was also one of the Long Island Motor Parkway's originators.

Additionally, Alvord briefly taught at Syracuse University, where he had previously attended college, and also served as the General Secretary of the Rochester YMCA.

=== Development style ===
Alvord, who was active in – and an advocate for – civic improvement and the beautification of streets, was known for making his developments with "park-like atmospheres." He was known for having architects design the homes in his communities to be of various architectural styles, and required that the dwellings built within his communities have setbacks in order to ensure that they all had large front lawns.

== Death ==
Alvord died on April 18, 1941, at the age of 84 at Tampa Hospital in Tampa, Florida – although some sources state that his death took place in 1937.

== Personal life ==
Alvord was married to Nellie Barnum, who was a descendant of Alexander Hamilton. Alvord himself was a direct descendant of Johnathan Edwards (and was therefore also a distant relative to Aaron Burr) on his mother's side.

Alvord had two sons and two daughters. He also had a sister, Emily Feigel.

== Notable developments ==
- Belle Terre, New York
- Harbor Oaks, Florida
- Laurelton, Queens
- Prospect Park South, Brooklyn
- Roslyn Estates, New York
