= Doreen Giuliano =

Mother of American convicted murderer

- Born: Brooklyn, New York, U.S.

Doreen Quinn Giuliano is the mother of John Giuca, who in 2003 was convicted of the murder of Mark Fisher. Giuliano went undercover to investigate possible juror misconduct in the trial. Because of her activities, Giuliano has been called "Mother Justice."

Her story has been reported by The Guardian, Vanity Fair, ABC's Nightline, WCHB Detroit's Mildred in the Morning, Anderson Live, the radio program Here and Now, and other media outlets.

== Background ==
Giuliano was born in the Red Hook neighborhood of Brooklyn. One of eight children, she raised in an Irish working-class family. She met Giuca's father, John Giuca Sr., when she was 18, and they have a son, John Giuca. By age 23, Giuliano separated from him and met Frank Giuliano.

With Giuliano, they had two children: a son named Matthew and a daughter, Mallory. In 1992, Mallory died at the age of four due to complications of cerebral palsy. Giuliano and her husband continued to raise their family in Prospect Park South, Brooklyn.

== Giuca trial ==
The body of Mark Fisher was found October 12, 2003 on Argyle Road in the affluent Prospect Park South neighborhood of Brooklyn, NY. Antonio Russo was arrested in connection to the crime on November 19, 2004, followed by Giuliano's son John Giuca on December 21, 2004.

Giuca's trial lasted two weeks, and despite a lack of forensic evidence, Giuca was convicted under the felony murder rule in a trial by jury and sentenced to 25 years to life on October 19, 2005. Testimony was heard from several witnesses, including statements from former suspect Albert Cleary and John Avitto, a jailhouse informant who claimed to have overheard conversations between Giuca and visitors.

Later, there was alleged misconduct by Jason Allo, a juror in the trial. Upon hearing that Allo had a personal connection to one of Giuca's friends, Giuliano decided to investigate the allegations in hopes of exonerating her son. As jurors are vetted to ensure they have no knowledge of a case, its witnesses or defendants, establishing a connection would be grounds for a new trial, as Allo would have been ineligible to serve on the jury.

=== Undercover investigation ===
After her son's trial, Giuliano obtained a transcript of the voir dire and discovered Jason Allo's occupation as well as information indicating he lived in the Bensonhurst neighborhood of Brooklyn. She pursued several leads, eventually finding her way to Allo.

She knew little about Allo at the onset of her investigation. After nearly a year of surveillance and intelligence gathering, Giuliano launched phase two of her plan. She befriended Allo while disguised as Dee Quinn, and kept an audio recording device on her at all times while in his vicinity. After many months she alleged juror misconduct that would later become the basis for her son's appeal.

During Giuliano's initial encounter with Allo, she claimed to be a recent arrival to Brooklyn from California, and a party-goer. Several weeks after their initial meeting, once "Quinn" had gained Allo's friendship, he began talking about her son's trial, which she recorded. He revealed that he had known Giuca's friends since high school. He stated that he should not have been able to serve on the jury had he been forthright about his connection, and claimed that he was the first juror to pursue a guilty verdict during the deliberation. Allo admitted to having a connection to Giuca's clique and his alleged gang, and that he discussed the proceedings during the trial with his cousin, who had dated a friend of John Giuca.

=== Appeals ===
Using the evidence she obtained, Giuliano was able to bring an appeal in her son's case brought before the courts. On October 14, 2010, arguments were heard requesting Giuca receive a new trial.

The Appellant Division 2nd Department summarily denied a hearing request be held to review evidence of juror misconduct because there were no affidavits from Jason Allo admitting guilt. The request for a new hearing is currently pending in the United States Court of Appeals for the Federal Circuit.

== Media attention ==
Giuliano has garnered attention from numerous media outlets, appearing on television and radio as well as in newspapers and magazines. These include ABC's Nightline, On the Case with Paula Zahn, The Early Show, Vanity Fair, The New York Times, The Guardian, the Sydney Morning Herald, Anderson Live, and the Gothamist.
