= List of Leicestershire County Cricket Club grounds =

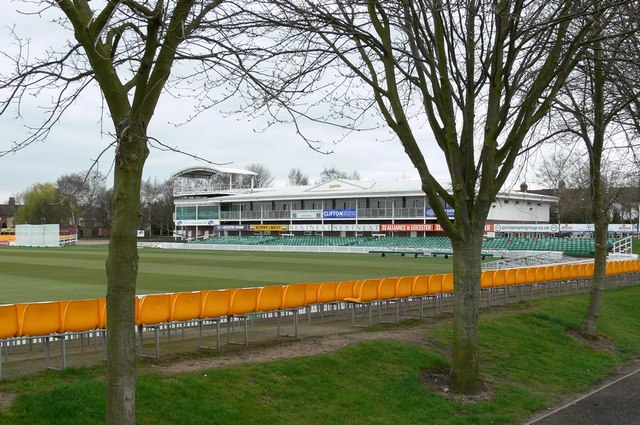
Grace Road in the city of Leicester has staged well over half the county's first-class games and almost every game in List A and Twenty20 cricket.

Leicestershire County Cricket Club is one of the 18 member clubs of the English County Championship, representing the historic county of Leicestershire. The club was established on 25 March 1879. It has since played first-class cricket from 1894, List A cricket from 1963 and Twenty20 cricket from 2003.^{[A]} Unlike most professional sports, in which a team usually has a single fixed home ground, county cricket clubs have traditionally used different grounds in various towns and cities within the county for home matches, although the use of minor "out grounds" has diminished since the 1980s. Leicestershire's first XI have played home matches at fifteen different grounds.

The club's debut home match in first-class cricket was played at Grace Road in Leicester. After the 1900 season, the club ceased using Grace Road, as it was felt that it was located too far from the centre of the city. Instead, Aylestone Road became the club's headquarters, and staged nearly 400 first-class matches between 1901 and the outbreak of the Second World War. Due to a combination of wartime damage and industrial development, however, the club was forced to discontinue using Aylestone Road after the war, and Grace Road once again became the club's main venue. In the years after the war, the county also utilised grounds in other towns including Hinckley, Melton Mowbray, Barwell and Loughborough.

In addition to the county's inaugural first-class match, Grace Road also played host to Leicestershire's first home games in the other formats of cricket. In 1964 it staged the county's first home List A game against Northamptonshire and in 2003 it was the venue for the county's first home game in Twenty20 cricket against Yorkshire. The ground has hosted the vast majority of the county's games, including every Twenty20 match since the introduction of that format. Since 1991, when the club played its last game at Leicester Road in Hinckley, the only venue other than Grace Road to host any of Leicestershire's matches is the Oakham School Ground, which is actually located in the adjacent county of Rutland. The school was used for five first-class matches from 2000–07 and nine List A games from 2001–08, followed by a further List A game in 2018 after an absence of ten years.

== Grounds ==
Below is a complete list of grounds used by Leicestershire County Cricket Club for first-class, List A and Twenty20 matches. Statistics are complete through to the end of the 2020 season. Only matches played by Leicestershire CCC at the grounds are recorded in the table. Matches abandoned without any play occurring are not included.

| Name | Location | First-class | | | List A | | | Twenty20 | | |
| Name | Location | First | Last | Matches | First | Last | Matches | First | Last | Matches |
|---|---|---|---|---|---|---|---|---|---|---|
| Grace Road | Leicester | 17 May 1894 v Yorkshire | 22 August 2020 v Nottinghamshire | 845 | 27 May 1964 v Northamptonshire | 6 May 2019 v Warwickshire | 508 | 16 June 2003 v Yorkshire | 18 September 2020 v Nottinghamshire | 108 |
| Aylestone Road | Leicester | 13 May 1901 v Surrey | 16 June 1962 v Cambridge University | 399 | – | – | 0 | – | – | 0 |
| Ashby Road | Hinckley | 19 August 1911 v Warwickshire | 17 July 1937 v Worcestershire | 19 | – | – | 0 | – | – | 0 |
| Bath Grounds | Ashby-de-la-Zouch | 20 June 1912 v Derbyshire | 6 June 1964 v Derbyshire | 43 | – | – | 0 | – | – | 0 |
| Park Road | Loughborough | 31 May 1913 v Nottinghamshire | 9 August 1952 v Kent | 15 | 2 August 1970 v Nottinghamshire | no other matches to date | 1 | – | – | 0 |
| Fox and Goose Ground | Coalville | 12 June 1913 v Worcestershire | 11 July 1914 v Worcestershire | 2 | – | – | 0 | – | – | 0 |
| College Ground | Loughborough | 13 June 1928 v Derbyshire | 6 July 1929 v Glamorgan | 2 | – | – | 0 | – | – | 0 |
| Oakham School Ground | Oakham | 31 August 1935 v Kent | 30 May 2007 v Nottinghamshire | 9 | 3 June 2001 v Lancashire | 31 May 2018 v Nottinghamshire | 10 | – | – | 0 |
| Egerton Park | Melton Mowbray | 1 June 1946 v Somerset | 29 May 1948 v Kent | 3 | – | – | 0 | – | – | 0 |
| Kirkby Road | Barwell | 19 June 1946 v Lancashire | 25 June 1947 v Worcestershire | 3 | – | – | 0^{[B]} | – | – | 0 |
| Town Ground | Coalville | 10 June 1950 v Warwickshire | no other matches to date | 1 | – | – | 0 | – | – | 0 |
| Coventry Road | Hinckley | 23 June 1951 v Middlesex | 22 July 1964 v Kent | 17 | – | – | 0 | – | – | 0 |
| Brush Ground | Loughborough | 16 May 1953 v Hampshire | 19 June 1965 v Middlesex | 16 | – | – | 0 | – | – | 0 |
| Snibston Colliery Ground | Coalville | 5 June 1957 v Glamorgan | 10 July 1982 v Derbyshire | 8 | 12 July 1970 v Glamorgan | no other matches to date | 1 | – | – | 0 |
| Leicester Road | Hinckley | 29 July 1981 v Nottinghamshire | 2 July 1991 v Gloucestershire | 11 | 3 June 1984 v Essex | no other matches to date | 1^{[B]} | – | – | 0 |

== Notes ==
A. First-class cricket matches are designed to be contested over multiple days, with each team permitted two innings with no limit to the number of overs in an innings. List A matches, also known as limited overs or one-day matches, are intended to be completed in a single day and restrict each team to a single innings of between 40 and 60 overs, depending on the specific competition. Twenty20 matches restrict each team to a single innings of 20 overs.

B. The Leicestershire Cricket Board team played one List A match at each of Kirkby Road and Leicester Road in 2001. The Leicestershire Cricket Board is a separate organisation from Leicestershire County Cricket Club and its matches are not included in the totals.
