= Edwin Odell =

English cricketer

Personal information
- Full name: Edwin Freame Odell
- Born: 2 December 1883; Leicester, England
- Died: 11 March 1960 (aged 76); Northfield, Worcestershire, England
- Batting: Left-handed
- Bowling: Left-arm medium
- Relatives: William Odell (brother)

Domestic team information
- Years: Team
- 1912: Leicestershire

Career statistics
Competition	First-class
Matches	1
Runs scored	0
Batting average	0.00
100s/50s	–/–
Top score	0
Balls bowled	84
Wickets	2
Bowling average	21.00
5 wickets in innings	–
10 wickets in match	–
Best bowling	2/42
Catches/stumpings	–/–
- Source: Cricinfo, 26 January 2013

Edwin Freame Odell (2 December 1883 in Leicester – 11 March 1960) was an English cricketer. Odell was a left-handed batsman who bowled left-arm medium pace.

Odell made a single first-class appearance for Leicestershire against Northamptonshire in the 1912 County Championship at Aylestone Road, Leicester. In Leicestershire's first-innings of 96 all out, Odell was dismissed for a duck by Sydney Smith. In Northamptonshire's first-innings of 211/8 declared, Odell took the wickets of William East and Smith, finishing with figures of 2/42 from fourteen overs. Leicestershire reached 98/6 in their second-innings, with Odell not called upon to bat and the match ending as a draw.

He died at Northfield, Worcestershire on 11 March 1960. His brother William Odell also played first-class cricket. William was killed in action during the First World War.
