= Fox and Goose Ground =

Former cricket ground in Coalville, United Kingdom

Coordinates: 52°43′08.76″N 1°21′36.12″W

Ground information
- Location: Coalville, Leicestershire
- Establishment: c. 1913

Team information
Leicestershire	(1913–1914)
- As of 20 October 2020; Source: Ground profile

The Fox and Goose Ground was a cricket ground in Coalville, Leicestershire. Linked with the nearby Fox & Goose public house (now demolished), the ground was used as an outground by Leicestershire in 1913 and 1914. First-class cricket was played at the ground twice, with Leicestershire playing against Worcestershire in the 1913 and 1914 County Championship's, with Leicestershire winning both matches. Following the First World War, Leicestershire did not return to the ground. Cricket is no longer played at the ground, which is still in use as a recreation ground and is now known as Scotlands Playing Fields.

== First-class records ==
- Highest team total: 507 all out by Leicestershire v Worcestershire, 1914
- Lowest team total: 223 all out by Worcestershire v Leicestershire, 1914
- Highest individual innings: 227* by John King for Leicestershire v Worcestershire, 1914
- Best bowling in an innings: 7–58 by George Geary for Leicestershire v Worcestershire, 1913
- Best bowling in a match: 11–112 by George Geary, Leicestershire v Worcestershire, 1914

== See also ==
- List of Leicestershire County Cricket Club grounds
- List of cricket grounds in England and Wales
