= College Ground =

College Ground may refer to:

- College Ground, Cheltenham, a cricket ground in the grounds of Cheltenham College, England
- College Ground, Loughborough, a former cricket stadium in Loughborough, Leicestershire, England, now occupied by Loughborough University Students' Union
- College Ground, Bulsar, India, hosted five Ranji Trophy games in the 1970s
