= Oakham School Ground =

Cricket ground in Oakham, England

Coordinates: 52°40′27.18″N 0°43′43.92″W

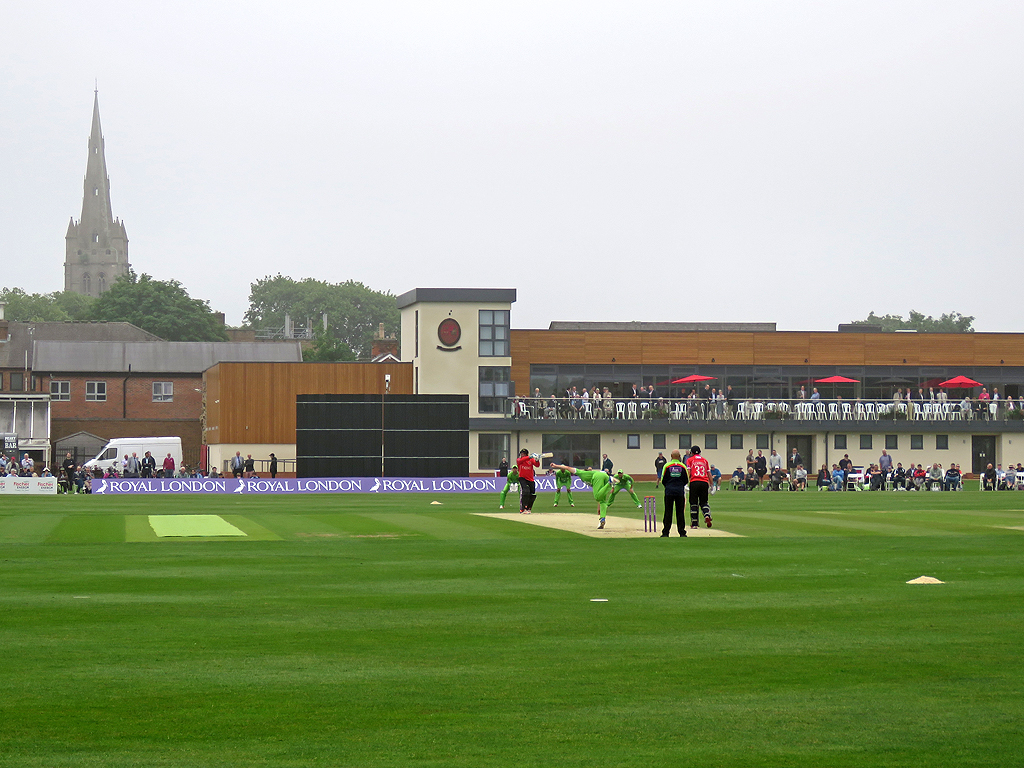
- Interactive map of Oakham School Ground

Ground information
- Location: Oakham, Rutland
- Country: England
- Establishment: 1821
- End names
- Nursery End; Sports Hall End

Team information
Leicestershire	(1935–2018)
- As of 26 October 2020; Source: Ground profile

Oakham School is a cricket ground in Oakham, Rutland. Forming part of sports facilities of Oakham School, the ground dates from around 1821. First-class cricket was first played at Oakham School in the 1935 County Championship, with Leicestershire playing against Kent. Leicestershire used the ground as an outground on three more occasions prior to the Second World War. Following a gap of 62 years, first-class cricket returned to Oakham School in 2000, when Leicestershire played the 1999 County Champions Surrey. The ground has since been used intermittently as an outground for first-class matches by Leicestershire, with five matches played there since 2000. During the first decade of the 2000s, Leicestershire played nine List A one-day matches at the ground between 2001 and 2008, before returning after a ten-year gap when they played Lancashire in the 2018 Royal London One-Day Cup. In 2020, Leicestershire announced plans to revive the Oakham Cricket Festival and make it a permanent part of Leicestershire's county schedule.

== Records ==
First-class

- Highest team total: 534 all out by Leicestershire v Derbyshire, 2004
- Lowest team total: 56 all out by Kent v Leicestershire, 1935
- Highest individual innings: 295* by Ali Brown for Surrey v Leicestershire, 2000
- Best bowling in an innings: 8–123 by Tich Freeman for Kent v Leicestershire, 1935
- Best bowling in a match: 11–106 by Frank Woolley, for Kent v Leicestershire, 1938

List A

- Highest team total: 299 for 5 by Nottinghamshire v Leicestershire, 2007
- Lowest team total: 137 all out by Leicestershire v Worcestershire, 2004
- Highest individual innings: 107 by Stephen Fleming for Nottinghamshire v Leicestershire, 2007
- Best bowling in an innings: 4–12 by Dinesh Mongia for Leicestershire v Somerset, 2005

== See also ==
- List of Leicestershire County Cricket Club grounds
- List of cricket grounds in England and Wales
