= Egerton Park =

Cricket ground in Melton Mowbray, Leicestershire, England

Coordinates: 52.764998°N 0.893638°W

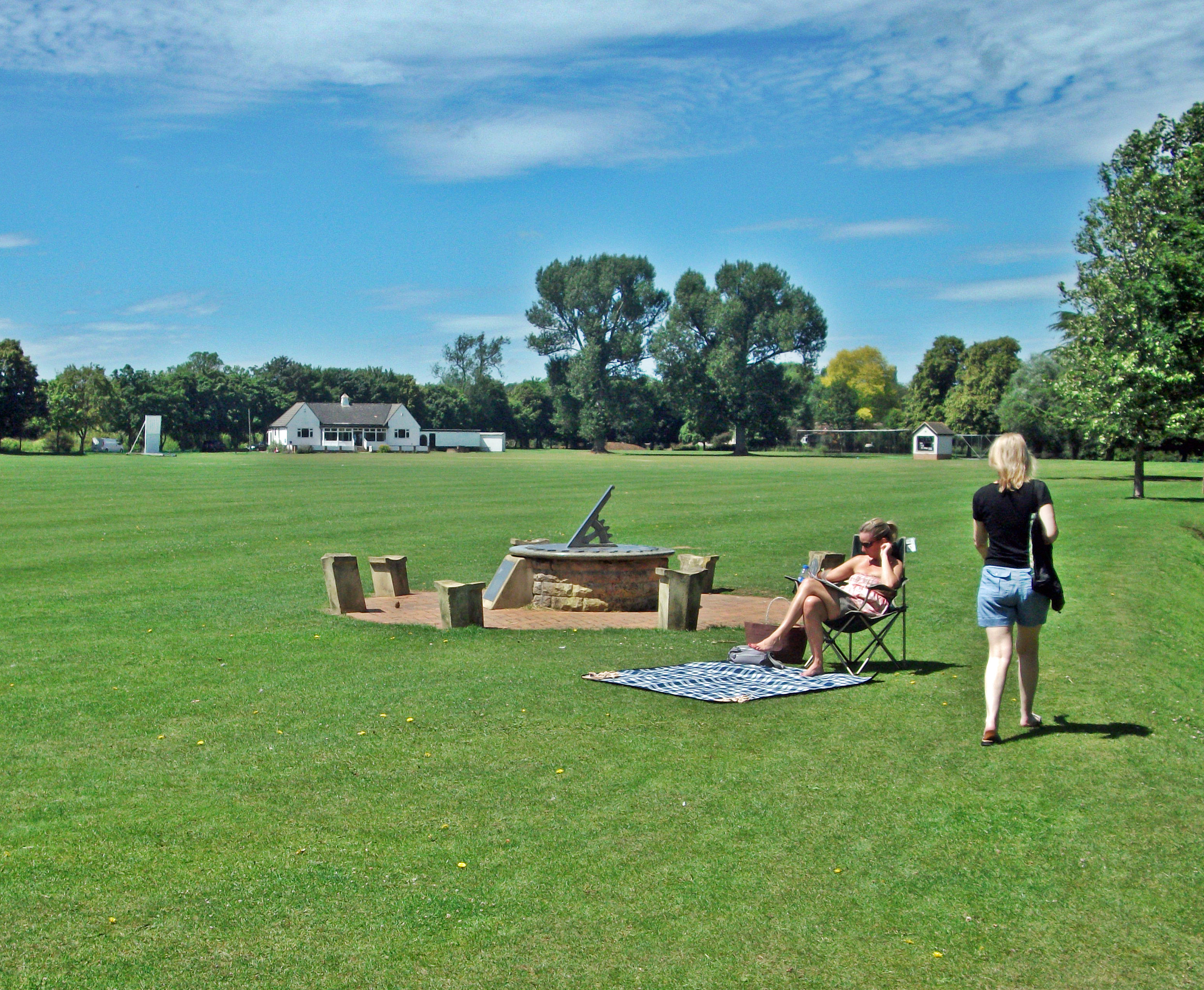

Ground information
- Location: Melton Mowbray, Leicestershire
- Establishment: 1931

Team information
Leicestershire	(1946–1948)
- As of 22 October 2020; Source: Ground profile

Egerton Park is a cricket ground in Melton Mowbray, Leicestershire. The land for the park was purchased from the Egerton Lodge Estate by the Melton Mowbray Town Estate in 1931. Egerton Park was used as an outground by Leicestershire following the Second World War, playing three first-class cricket matches there against Somerset, Lancashire and Kent in the 1946, 1947 and 1948 County Championship's respectively. Egerton Park played host to international cricket in 1986, when Malaysia played Zimbabwe in the ICC Trophy, though the match carried no official status.

== First-class records ==
- Highest team total: 355 all out by Lancashire v Leicestershire, 1947
- Lowest team total: 141 all out by Leicestershire v Somerset, 1946
- Highest individual innings: 102* by Arthur Fagg for Kent v Leicestershire, 1948
- Best bowling in an innings: 7–56 by Jack Walsh for Leicestershire v Somerset, 1946
- Best bowling in a match: 13–107 by Jack Walsh, as above

== See also ==
- List of Leicestershire County Cricket Club grounds
- List of cricket grounds in England and Wales
