= Tony Pearson (cricketer) =

English cricketer (born 1941)

Personal information
- Full name: Anthony John Grayhurst Pearson
- Born: 30 December 1941 (age 84); Pinner, Middlesex, England
- Batting: Right-handed
- Bowling: Right-arm fast-medium

Domestic team information
- Years: Team
- 1961–1963: Somerset
- 1961–1963: Cambridge University

Career statistics
Competition	First-class
Matches	42
Runs scored	355
Batting average	8.87
100s/50s	0/0
Top score	30
Balls bowled	8847
Wickets	139
Bowling average	28.18
5 wickets in innings	2
10 wickets in match	1
Best bowling	10/78
Catches/stumpings	29/0
- Source: Cricinfo, 9 March 2014

Anthony John Grayhurst Pearson (born 30 December 1941 in Pinner, Middlesex) is a former English cricketer who played first-class cricket for Cambridge University and Somerset between 1961 and 1963.

Tony Pearson was educated at Downside School and Jesus College, Cambridge. He took 10 for 78 for Cambridge versus Leicestershire at Loughborough in July 1961. Only Sammy Woods (who performed the feat in 1890) has also taken all ten wickets in an innings for Cambridge.

He later qualified as a doctor.
