= Park Road, Loughborough =

Cricket stadium in Loughborough, Leicestershire, England

Coordinates: 52°45′44.06″N 1°12′12.94″W

Ground information
- Location: Loughborough, Leicestershire
- Establishment: 1896

Team information
Leicestershire	(1913–1970)
- As of 21 October 2020; Source: Ground profile

Park Road is a cricket ground in Loughborough, Leicestershire. Established along with the formation of Loughborough Town Cricket Club in 1896, the ground first played host to first-class cricket in 1913, when Leicestershire played Nottinghamshire in the County Championship. Leicestershire played at the ground eitherside of the First World War, but did not return until 1933. Leicestershire regularly used Park Road as an outground throughout the 1930s, before the Second World War brought about the suspension of county cricket. Leicestershire resumed playing there after the war and used the ground until 1952, having played fifteen first-class matches there since their first match at the ground in 1913. Leicestershire returned to Park Road 18 years later, playing a List A one-day match there against Nottinghamshire in the 1970 John Player League. The ground is still in use by Loughborough Town Cricket Club.

== First-class records ==
- Highest team total: 507 for 8 declared by Derbyshire v Leicestershire, 1933
- Lowest team total: 77 all out by Leicestershire v Surrey, 1914
- Highest individual innings: 233 by Les Townsend for Derbyshire v Leicestershire, 1933
- Best bowling in an innings: 8–103 by Jack Walsh for Leicestershire v Nottinghamshire, 1949
- Best bowling in a match: 15–164 by Jack Walsh, as above

== See also ==
- List of Leicestershire County Cricket Club grounds
- List of cricket grounds in England and Wales
