= Snibston Colliery Ground =

Cricket ground in Coalville, Leicestershire

Coordinates: 52°43′26.60″N 1°22′51.54″W

Ground information
- Location: Coalville, Leicestershire
- Establishment: c. 1948

Team information
Leicestershire	(1957–1982)
- As of 24 October 2020; Source: Ground profile

Snibston Colliery Ground was a cricket ground in Coalville, Leicestershire. The land for the cricket ground was originally set aside for the miners at Snibston Colliery. Snibston Colliery was used as an outground by Leicestershire following the Second World War, with the county first playing there against Glamorgan in 1957 County Championship. Leicestershire player there intermittently until 1982, playing eight first-class matches there, plus a single List A one-day match against Glamorgan in the 1970 John Player League. The loss of first-class cricket at Snibston Colliery coincided with a downturn in fortune of the colliery. Snibston Grange Cricket Club continued to play at and maintain the ground, with Coalville Town F.C. moving to part of the ground in 1995 and establishing their Owen Street Sports Ground there. The cricket club folded in 2013, leaving Coalville Town F.C. as the sole tenant of the site.

== First-class records ==
- Highest team total: 387 for 7 declared by Nottinghamshire v Leicestershire, 1959
- Lowest team total: 65 all out by Worcestershire v Leicestershire, 1961
- Highest individual innings: 150* by Jimmy Gray for Hampshire v Leicestershire, 1960
- Best bowling in an innings: 8–70 by Geoff Miller for Leicestershire v Derbyshire, 1982
- Best bowling in a match: 12–138 by Geoff Miller, as above

== See also ==
- List of Leicestershire County Cricket Club grounds
- List of cricket grounds in England and Wales
