= Aylestone Road =

Cricket ground in Leicester, England

Coordinates: 52°37′17″N 1°08′15″W

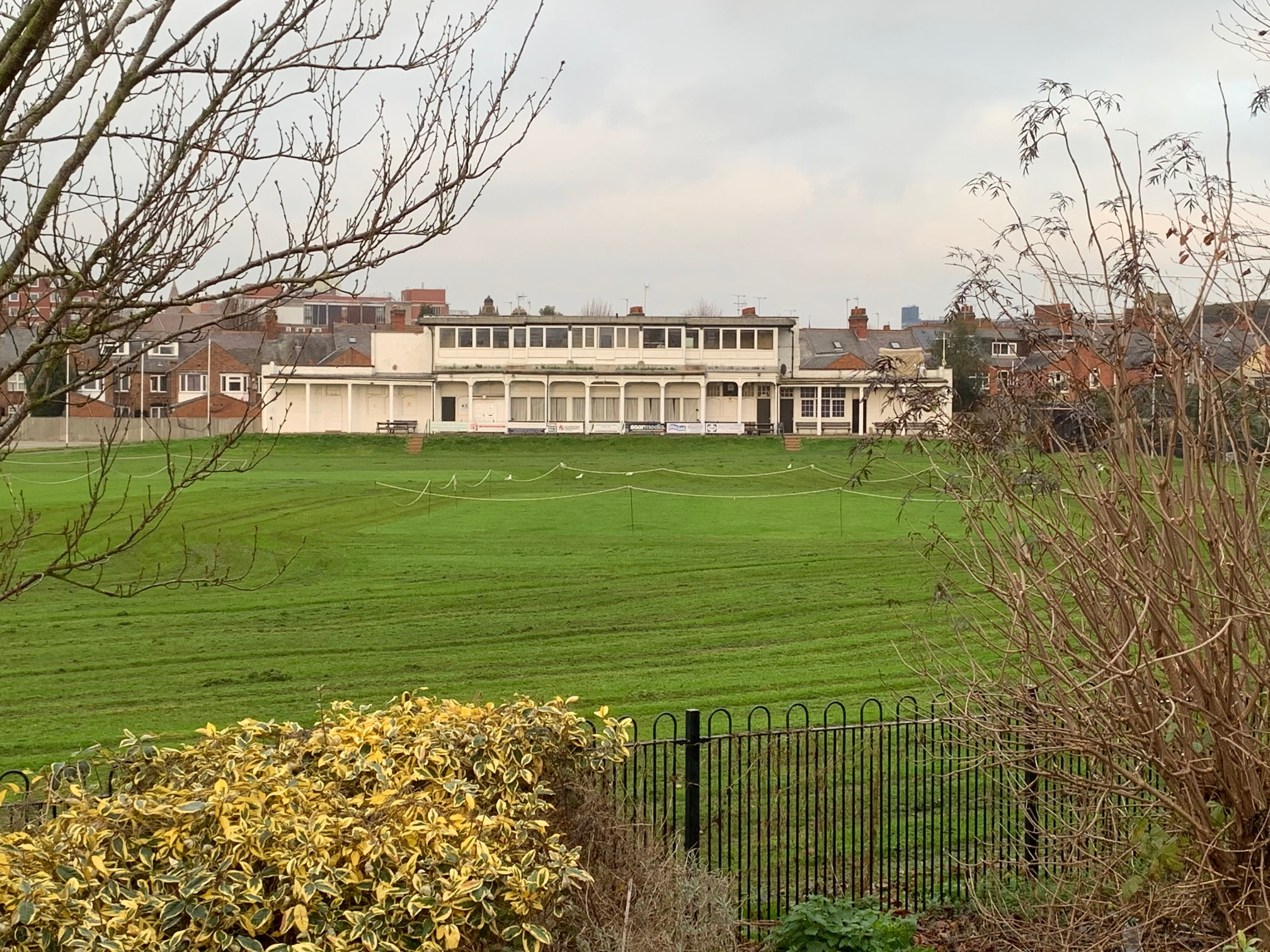
- Former Leicestershire County Cricket Club HQ
- Interactive map of Aylestone Road

Ground information
- Location: Leicester, England
- Country: England
- Establishment: 1877

International information
- First women's ODI: 18 July 1990: England v Netherlands
- Last women's ODI: 20 July 1990: Denmark v Netherlands
- As of 6 September 2020; Source: Ground profile

Aylestone Road, now also known as the Leicester Electricity Sports Cricket Ground, is a cricket ground in Leicester, England, which was the headquarters of Leicestershire County Cricket Club from 1901 to 1939. Although the playing area is much reduced by housing and commercial developments, it is still used as a cricket ground, though not by the county team.

== Early history ==
The previous centre of cricket in Leicester had been at Victoria Park, where informal Leicestershire representative sides played. Costs associated with enclosing aspects of what was an open park proved costly, requiring a permanent home for cricket in the city. In 1877, land was purchased for the sum of £40,000 and a sports complex, known as Grace Road, was constructed. This included an athletics track, cricket ground and hotel. This ground held its first cricket match in 1878, when Leicestershire defeated a touring Australian club side, with 30,000 people in attendance. What would become the cricket ground at Aylestone Road existed in a sporting capacity since at least 1891, temporarily serving as the home ground of Leicester Fosse F.C. while their new ground at Filbert Street was under construction.

Having gained first-class status in 1895, Leicestershire County Cricket Club initially played their home matches at Grace Road, however it was considered too far away from the city centre by the Leicestershire committee and with poor transport links leading to low crowds, it was decided in 1901 to relocate the county club headquarters to the cricket ground further up the Aylestone Road and closer to the city centre, close to the football stadium at Filbert Street and the rugby stadium at Welford Road. The ground hosted its inaugural first-class match in the 1901 County Championship, with Surrey as the visitors.

== Use by Leicestershire ==
Leicestershire played all their first-class fixtures at Aylestone Road from 1901 to 1913, when they used Park Road in Loughborough as an outground. During the First World War the ground was requisitioned as a base for military training and headquarters of the Leicester Town Rifles. From hosting its inaugural first-class match in 1901 through to 1939, Aylestone Road hosted 396 first-class matches.

During the Second World War, the ground was requisitioned to serve as a quartermaster's depot for the American 82nd Airborne Division. During the war, the ground was damaged by German bombing, which caused damage to the main stand. Following the war, the expansion of Leicester power station by Leicester City Council necessitated the return of the county club back to their former Grace Road headquarters, due to the ground being blighted by black soot, coupled with the cooling towers making the pitch consistently damp.

== Later history ==
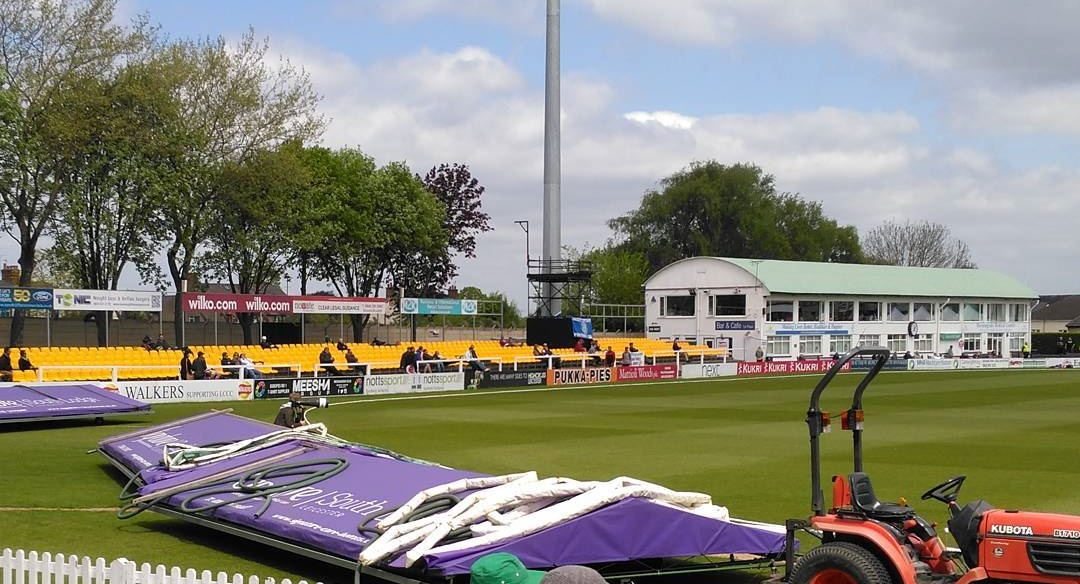
The Meet (pictured right) was moved to Grace Road from Aylestone Road in 1952–53

After moving back to Grace Road, Leicestershire removed the main stand from Aylestone Road in 1952–53 and reconstructed it at Grace Road, initially naming it the Richards Stand, before settling on its current name The Meet. Leicestershire returned to the Aylestone Road ground in 1957, playing two matches in the County Championship against Derbyshire and Hampshire. Leicestershire played their 399th and final first-class match at Aylestone Road in 1962, against Cambridge University. In 1990, the ground played host to women's international cricket when it hosted two Women's One Day Internationals in the 1990 Women's European Cricket Cup between England women and the Netherlands women in the first match, and Denmark women and the Netherlands women in the second match.

The ground is still used for cricket. It is the home ground of the Leicester Electricity Sports Cricket Club. Its playing area is greatly reduced and several outbuildings have been demolished, but the pavilion still stands. The ground has been substantially renovated by South Leicestershire College as part of a NatWest Cricket Force initiative.

== First-class records ==
- Highest team total: 590 for 5 declared by Australians v Leicestershire, 1938
- Lowest team total: 25 all out by Leicestershire v Kent, 1912
- Highest individual innings: 341 by George Hirst for Yorkshire v Leicestershire, 1905
- Best bowling in an innings: 10–64 by Tommy Mitchell for Derbyshire v Leicestershire, 1935
- Best bowling in a match: 16–102 by Colin Blythe for Kent v Leicestershire, 1909

== See also ==
- List of Leicestershire County Cricket Club grounds
- List of cricket grounds in England and Wales
