= Thomas Jayes =

English cricketer (1877–1913)

Personal information
- Full name: Thomas Jayes
- Born: 17 April 1877; Ratby, Leicestershire, England
- Died: 16 April 1913 (aged 35); Ratby, Leicestershire, England
- Batting: Right-handed
- Bowling: Right-arm fast
- Role: All-rounder

Domestic team information
- Years: Team
- 1903–11: Leicestershire
- First-class debut: 4 June 1903 Leicestershire v Surrey
- Last First-class: 17 May 1911 Leicestershire v Nottinghamshire

Career statistics
Competition	First-class
Matches	128
Runs scored	2764
Batting average	14.54
100s/50s	1/11
Top score	100
Balls bowled	22661
Wickets	535
Bowling average	23.98
5 wickets in innings	41
10 wickets in match	9
Best bowling	9/78
Catches/stumpings	117/–
- Source: CricketArchive, 13 July 2013

Thomas Jayes (17 April 1877 – 16 April 1913) was an English first-class cricketer who played for Leicestershire between 1903 and 1911. He was born and died at Ratby, Leicestershire. Jayes was a right-arm fast bowler and a hard-hitting lower middle-order right-handed batsman; unusually for fast bowlers of the era when he played, he was also rated as a good fielder.

== Early cricket ==
Jayes made his debut for Leicestershire in a few games in 1903, but made little impression. He returned to the Leicestershire team in 1905 when John King was injured and in his second game he took 10 Essex wickets for 134 runs in an innings victory, including seven for 84 in the second innings. He retained his place when King returned and in 22 matches in 1905 took 102 wickets at an average of 23.79, a material part of Leicestershire's most successful season since they achieved first-class status in 1895. Against Derbyshire he took nine wickets for 78 runs in the Derbyshire second innings: five clean bowled, two lbw, two caught and bowled and he caught the tenth batsman off the bowling of Sam Coe. In the same match, he made his highest score of the season with the bat, with 74; his batting was slower to develop, but he scored 525 runs in 1905 at an average of 21.00 and he also took 29 catches. Towards the end of the season, he was picked for "An Eleven of England" to play the Australian touring team under the captaincy of the 57-year-old W. G. Grace; under Grace's individual captaincy, he bowled only three overs, took no wickets and made just 10 runs in two innings.

Jayes' batting and bowling returns in 1906 were similar to those of the previous season, though Leicestershire were a poor team, disunited on the field and off it, according to the report in the 1907 Wisden Cricketers' Almanack. Jayes and other bowlers, Wisden said, were "expensive": his 104 wickets in the season came at an average of 27.07. In terms of aggregate, this was his best season for batting, with 708 runs at an average of 19.13. The runs included his only first-class century, an innings of exactly 100 made in 105 minutes as part of a seventh-wicket stand of 158 with Albert Knight in the game against Warwickshire at Edgbaston. Three weeks later he was selected for the Players team in the Gentlemen v Players match at The Oval, in a season without Test cricket one of the most important fixtures of the season.

== Almost a Test player ==
Jayes' record in 1907 and 1908 was less impressive: his batting declined markedly and his total of wickets dropped to less than 70 in each season. But he returned to form in 1909 when he was involved in one of the more controversial episodes of the cricket season. England had won the first Test of the summer against the Australians comfortably by 10 wickets. The selection committee who chose the team for the second Test at Lord's omitted Gilbert Jessop and named 13 players, including both Jayes and King of Leicestershire, plus Tom Hayward if he could prove his fitness. On the morning of the match, despite weather that had made the pitch ideal for fast bowling, Jayes was left out and England went into the game without a fast bowler and with the unfit Hayward: the Australians won by nine wickets and went on to win The Ashes by two games to one, with two draws. Wisden's editor Sydney Pardon blamed "extraordinary blundering" in the selection committee for a match that, he wrote, "proved the turning point of the season". Jayes should not have been picked in the first place, Pardon wrote, because Walter Brearley should have been selected; but, "failing Brearley, Jayes ought clearly to have played, a right-handed fast bowler being, according to nearly all expert opinion, an absolute necessity at Lord's". Late in the season when the Test series was over, Jayes played for "An England XI" against the Australians in a "holiday game" at Blackpool, but he was not selected for any Tests. In all games in 1909, Jayes took 109 wickets at an average of 20.91, both the best aggregate and the best average of his career.

Much of the 1910 season was damp and Wisden noted that Jayes and other Leicestershire bowlers suffered from soggy pitches. Jayes took 83 wickets at an average of 22.75. With the bat, he made 87 out of 112 in 55 minutes in King's benefit match against Nottinghamshire, with five sixes and four fours. He also made a second appearance in a Gentlemen v Players match at The Oval, though rather oddly he did not bowl in the game.

== Decline and death ==
In 1911, Jayes was suffering from tuberculosis and played only two matches for Leicestershire, failing to take a single wicket, before dropping out of the team. Leicestershire sent him to Switzerland in the hope of a cure "but there was never much hope of his recovery", Wisden noted. The county also granted him a benefit in 1912, though he did not play again, and he died a day short of his 36th birthday in April 1913.

Jayes was the uncle of the England and Leicestershire all-rounder Ewart Astill, with whom he played from 1906 to 1911.
