= Ewart Astill =

English cricketer

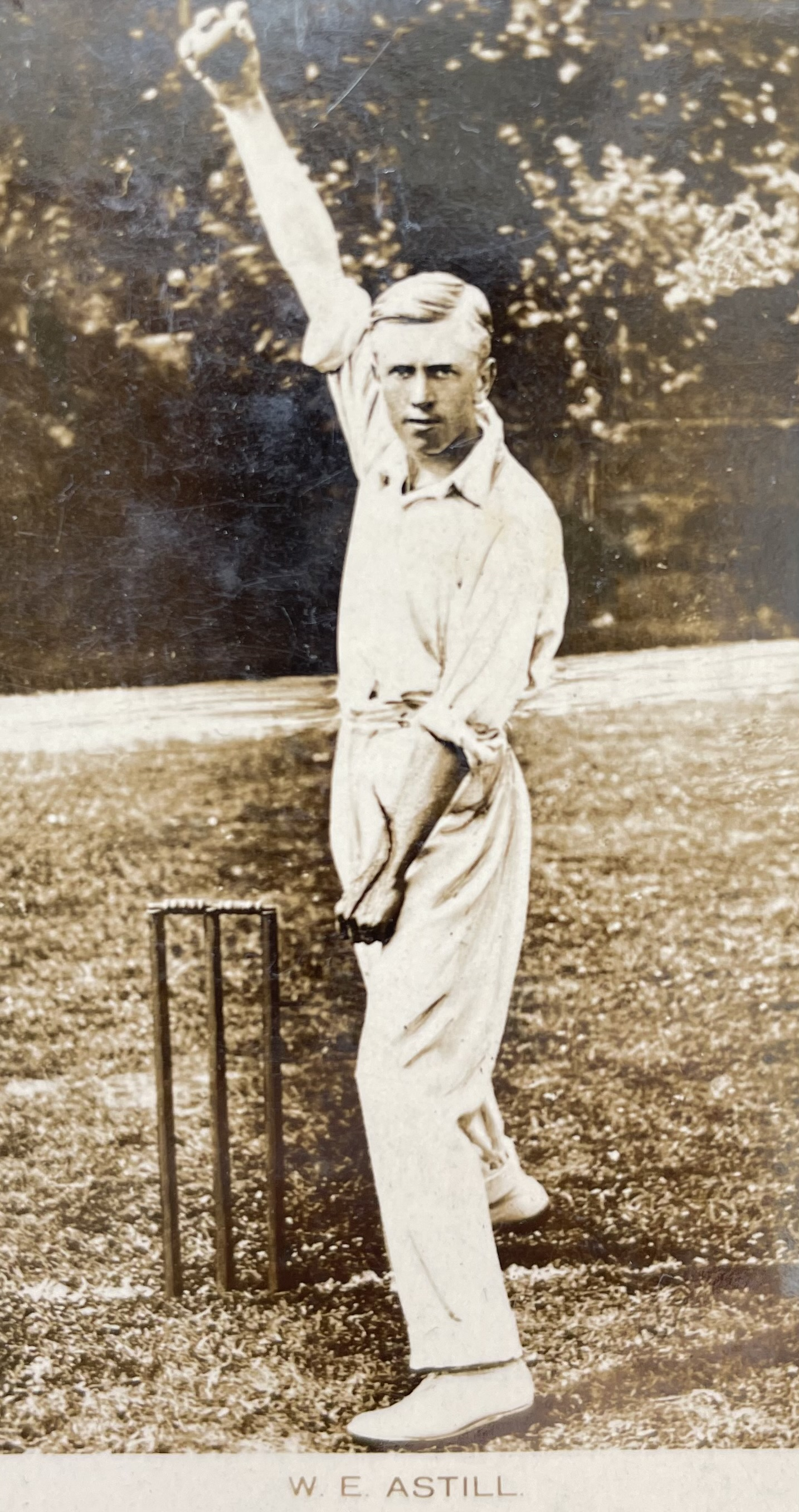

Cricket information
- Batting: Right-handed
- Bowling: Right-arm off break

International information
- National side: England
- Test debut: 24 December 1927 v South Africa
- Last Test: 12 April 1930 v West Indies

Career statistics
| Competition | Test | First-class |
|---|---|---|
| Matches | 9 | 733 |
| Runs scored | 190 | 22,735 |
| Batting average | 12.66 | 22.55 |
| 100s/50s | 0/0 | 15/107 |
| Top score | 40 | 164* |
| Balls bowled | 2,182 | 138,532 |
| Wickets | 25 | 2,432 |
| Bowling average | 34.66 | 23.76 |
| 5 wickets in innings | 0 | 140 |
| 10 wickets in match | 0 | 22 |
| Best bowling | 4/58 | 9/41 |
| Catches/stumpings | 7/– | 466/– |
- Source: CricketArchive, 30 December 2021

William Ewart Astill (1 March 1888 – 10 February 1948) was, along with George Geary, the mainstay of the Leicestershire team from 1922 to about 1935. He played in nine Test matches but was never picked for a home Test or for an Ashes tour. However, for the best part of three decades he was a vital member of a generally struggling Leicestershire team. With no amateur able to play frequently for the county, Astill became the first officially appointed professional captain of any county for over fifty years in 1935. The county enjoyed a useful season, but at forty-seven years of age, Astill was only a stop gap before an amateur of the required standard and availability could be found. He was a nephew of Leicestershire fast bowler Thomas Jayes.

== Pre-1914 career ==
Astill began his career at the age of eighteen in 1906. He played only one match that season, but his medium-paced right-hand bowling on the treacherous pitches of the following season was so difficult that he took in county cricket 74 wickets for 16.58. The following year, Astill was Leicestershire's chief bowler with 84 wickets. His thirteen for 61 against Derbyshire on a treacherous pitch was a result he was never able to beat for twenty-five years after that. He again did well in 1909, but struggled in 1910 and 1911 and was dropped from his team.

In the wet summer of 1912, Astill regained his place but was expensive considering the favourable conditions, and on the firmer wickets of 1913 he could not retain his place. In 1914, he played only five matches.

== War service ==
During the First World War, Astill gained a commission in the Machine Gun Corps. He played only thrice in 1919 because he was late to be demobilised as he was overseas (Snow p. 247).

== Great years ==
Astill started his career low in the batting order but emerged after the war number four or five. His maiden century in 1921 was against newly promoted Glamorgan at Swansea. He completed the double in each season from 1921 to 26, and again from 1928 to 30. He took over 150 wickets in 1921 and 144 in 1922, and his bowling, even if his action was not as high as in the 1900s, was always steady and occasionally deadly. Only in 1927 did he fail to take 100 wickets, but that season Astill made his highest first-class score of 164 against Glamorgan. In all he took 100 wickets in nine seasons and passed a thousand runs in eleven.

Astill, was never seriously in the running for a tour to Australia, but toured the West Indies with private parties during the middle 1920s, and played in five Tests on matting in South Africa in 1927/28, and four against the West Indies in 1929/1930, although he was not effective in those matches. In 1926/27 he was a member of the party that toured India, Ceylon (Sri Lanka) and Burma with the Marylebone Cricket Club (MCC), playing 24 matches and taking 71 wickets. His form declined from 1933 onwards.

== Later years ==
Although Astill retired at the end of 1937, Leicestershire was short of effective players and he was forced to come out of retirement twice in 1938 and in 1939. During World War II Astill rejoined the Army but later resigned his commission on the grounds of health. His health subsequently declined; he died in Leicester Hospital in February 1948 at age 59. He is buried in Welford Road Cemetery.

== Other interests ==
Ewart Astill was also a champion billiards player and according to EE Snow(p. 194), was a noted player of trick shots. He was also an accomplished singer and accompanist.
