= Grace Road =

Cricket ground in Leicester, England

Coordinates: 52°36′28″N 1°08′34″W

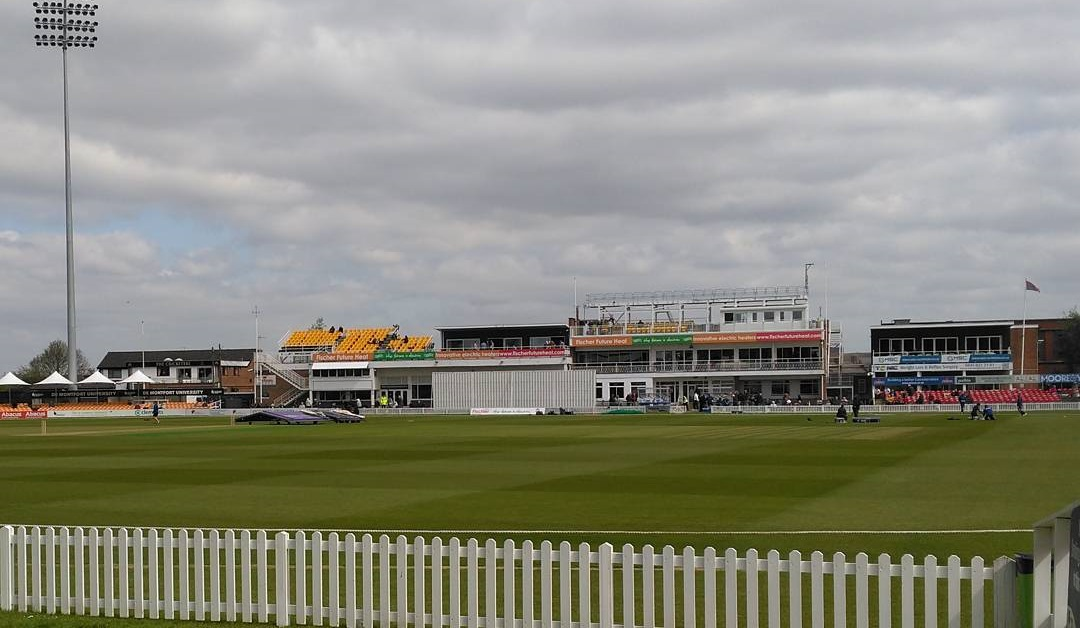
- The Pavilion at Grace Road
- Interactive map of Grace Road

Ground information
- Location: Leicester, England
- Country: England
- Establishment: 1878
- Capacity: 6,000 cricket matches / 19,999 music concerts
- End names
- Pavilion End Bennett End

International information
- First men's ODI: 11 June 1983: India v Zimbabwe
- Last men's ODI: 27 May 1999: Scotland v West Indies
- Only women's Test: 8–12 August 2006: England v India
- First women's ODI: 30 June 1984: England v New Zealand
- Last women's ODI: 1 September 2026: England v Ireland

Team information
Leicestershire	(1894 – present)
- As of 1 September 2026; Source: CricketArchive

Grace Road, known for sponsorship reasons as the Uptonsteel County Ground, Grace Road, is a cricket ground in Leicester, England. It is the home ground and administrative base of Leicestershire County Cricket Club.

== History ==
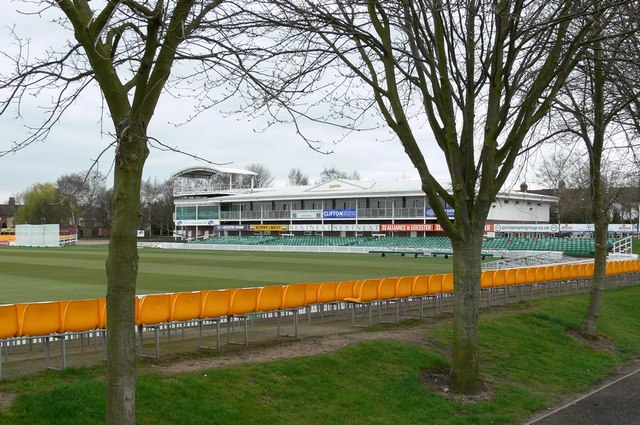
The Bennett End of the ground

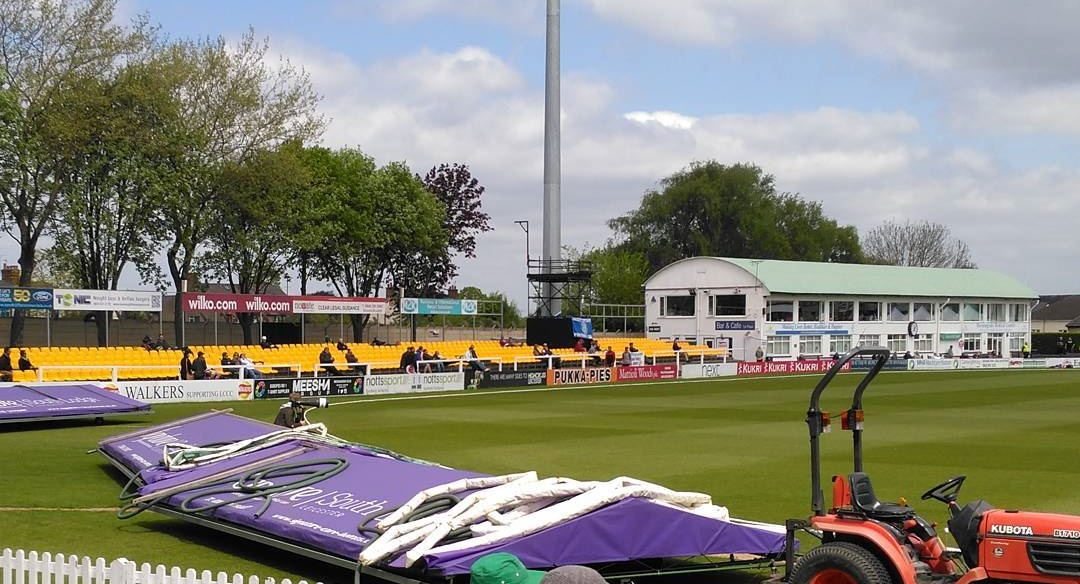
The Meet (right)

The previous centre of cricket in Leicester had been at Victoria Park, where informal Leicestershire representative sides played. Costs associated with enclosing an open park proved costly, requiring a permanent home for cricket in the city.

In 1877, Leicestershire County Cricket Club bought the land on which Grace Road now stands from the then Duke of Rutland, and spent the massive sum of £40,000 on developing a cricket club, athletic track and hotel.. The road was named after Grace Margaret Yearby, the daughter of a local property owner Edward John Yearby, not W. G. Grace.

This ground held its first cricket match in 1878, when Leicestershire played a touring Australia team.

Having gained first-class status in 1895, Leicestershire played at Grace Road only until 1900.

Leicestershire CCC left the Grace Road site in 1901, owing to low attendances at matches, which were blamed on lack of public transport to the ground. The club moved to a site on Aylestone Road in order to be closer to the city centre. Leicestershire eventually returned to Grace Road in 1946, after the end of the Second World War,, re-purchasing the land in 1966.

Leicestershire removed the main stand from Aylestone Road in 1952–53 and reconstructed it at Grace Road, initially naming it the Richards Stand, before settling on its current name The Meet.

The record attendance, at Leicestershire's match against the touring 1948 Australians, is 16,000.

== International cricket ==
Three One Day Internationals have been played at Grace Road, although none has involved the England team.

In the 1983 Cricket World Cup eventual winners India, chasing a target of 156, beat Zimbabwe by five wickets. The second and third games were both in the 1999 World Cup. In the second Zimbabwe beat India by three runs, and in the third the West Indies beat Scotland by eight wickets.

== International centuries ==
=== Women's Test centuries ===
One WTest century has been scored at the venue.

No.	Score	Player	Team	Balls	Opposing team	Innings	Date	Result
1	115	Claire Taylor	England	233	India	3	8 August 2006	Drawn

=== Women's One-Day International centuries ===
Eight WODI centuries have been scored at the venue.

No.	Score	Player	Team	Balls	Opposing team	Innings	Date	Result
1	106	Heather Knight	England	109	Pakistan	1	27 June 2017	Won
2	137	Natalie Sciver (1/2)	England	92	Pakistan	1	27 June 2017	Won
3	104*	Deandra Dottin	West Indies	76	Pakistan	1	11 July 2017	Won
4	117*	Sophie Devine	New Zealand	116	England	2	13 July 2018	Won
5	114	Tammy Beaumont (1/2)	England	115	Australia	1	4 July 2019	Lost
6	119	Tammy Beaumont (2/2)	England	107	South Africa	1	18 July 2022	Won
7	120	Nat Sciver-Brunt (2/2)	England	74	Sri Lanka	1	14 September 2023	Won
8	104	Maia Bouchier	England	95	Ireland	2	1 September 2026	Won

== Dimensions ==
In front of the wicket at both ends the pitch is measured at 63 metres, while square of the wicket on both sides the dimensions are recorded as 76 metres. This is the largest county ground including England's major international venues such as the Oval.

== See also ==
- List of cricket grounds in England and Wales
- List of Leicestershire County Cricket Club grounds
