= Kirkby Road =

Cricket ground in Barwell, England

Coordinates: 52.57291°N 1.34270°W

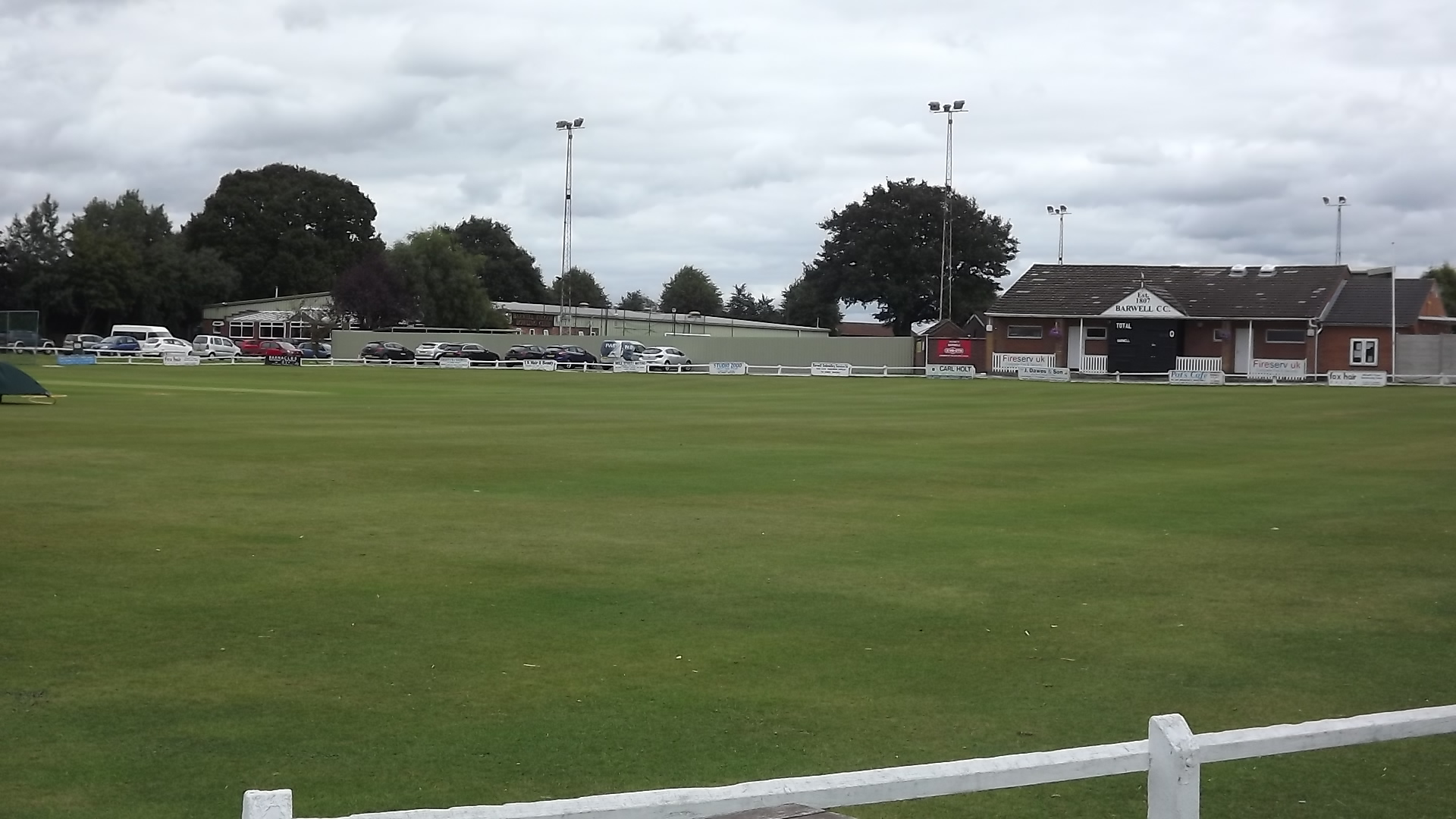

Ground information
- Location: Barwell, Leicestershire
- Establishment: c. 1913

Team information
Leicestershire	(1946–1947)
Leicestershire Cricket Board	(2001)
- As of 18 October 2020; Source: Ground profile

Kirkby Road is a cricket ground in Barwell, Leicestershire. Cricket in Barwell dates to 1807, with cricket being played at Kirkby Road since at least 1913. First-class cricket has been played there three times in 1946 and 1947, with Leicestershire playing Lancashire and Warwickshire in the 1946 County Championship and Worcestershire in the 1947 County Championship. Over half a century later in 2001, major cricket returned to the ground when it played host to a List A one-day match between the Leicestershire Cricket Board (LCB) and the Northamptonshire Cricket Board in the Cheltenham & Gloucester Trophy, which was won by the LCB, with their captain Neil Pullen scoring 88. The ground is still used by the village club and adjoins the football ground used by Barwell F.C.

== First-class records ==
- Highest team total: 245 all out by Worcestershire v Leicestershire, 1947
- Lowest team total: 55 all out by Leicestershire v Lancashire, 1946
- Highest individual innings: 89 by Les Berry for Leicestershire v Warwickshire, 1946
- Best bowling in an innings: 7–74 by Vic Jackson for Leicestershire v Lancashire, 1946
- Best bowling in a match: 12–113 by Eric Hollies, for Warwickshire v Leicestershire, 1946

== See also ==
- List of Leicestershire County Cricket Club grounds
- List of cricket grounds in England and Wales
