= John Savage (cricketer) =

English cricketer (1929–2008)

Personal information
- Full name: John Scholes Savage
- Born: 3 March 1929; Ramsbottom, Lancashire, England
- Died: 14 July 2008 (aged 79); Rochdale, Greater Manchester
- Batting: Right-handed
- Bowling: Right-arm off-spin
- Role: Bowler

Domestic team information
- Years: Team
- 1953–66: Leicestershire
- 1967–69: Lancashire
- First-class debut: 30 May 1953 Leicestershire v Oxford University
- Last First-class: 1 September 1969 Lancashire v Gloucestershire
- Only List A: 1 May 1963 Leicestershire v Lancashire

Career statistics
Competition	First-class	List A
Matches	347	1
Runs scored	2154	2
Batting average	7.20	2.00
100s/50s	–/–	–/–
Top score	33	2
Balls bowled	58199	48
Wickets	965	4
Bowling average	24.63	13.50
5 wickets in innings	46	–
10 wickets in match	7	–
Best bowling	8–50	4–54
Catches/stumpings	96/–	–/–
- Source: CricketArchive, 28 June 2013

John Scholes Savage (3 March 1929 – 14 July 2008) was an English cricketer who played first-class and List A cricket for Leicestershire and Lancashire between 1953 and 1969. He was born at Ramsbottom, Lancashire and died at Rochdale.

Savage was a right-arm off-break bowler who, unusually for his time, which was an era of increasingly defensive bowling, flighted the ball rather than bowling flat, and a right-handed tail-end batsman. In his first game for Leicestershire in 1953 he hit 31 and 8 not out, and therefore averaged 39.00 with the bat at that point: it proved to be a very false dawn in terms of his batting ability, as he only once surpassed that 31 and his highest score in 17 years was only 33.

It was as an off-spin bowler that, having played a few matches over several seasons, he joined the Leicestershire staff in 1957 and was virtually ever-present in the first team for the next 10 seasons, often providing the only spin alternative to a succession of seam bowlers. Within the first month of the 1957 season Savage had achieved what would prove to be his best batting and bowling performances. In his first match of the season, against Yorkshire, he scored 33. And 10 days later he took eight Gloucestershire wickets for 50 runs in the first innings at the Wagon Works Ground, Gloucester. He took 80 wickets at the economical average of 19.46 in 1957, and had a similar return, 93 wickets at 20.08 in 1958. He was awarded his county cap in 1958.

Savage took 101 wickets in 1959 and repeated the feat of 100 wickets in a season twice more, in 1961 and 1963. His best figures were 122 wickets at an average of 18.93 in 1961 when he also took a hat-trick of three wickets in three balls in the match against Somerset. At the end of the 1961 season he was picked for the Players team in the Gentlemen v Players match at the Scarborough Festival and took five wickets in the second innings to win the game. He was, wrote Wisden Cricketers' Almanack, "one of the best off-spinners in the country". At the start of the 1962 season, he was picked for the season opener match between the 1961 county champions, Yorkshire, and the Marylebone Cricket Club (MCC) and at the end of the season and in 1964 he appeared in other Scarborough Festival games; these games were his only representative cricket outside county matches, and with off-spinning all-rounders of the calibre of Fred Titmus, David Allen and Ray Illingworth as his contemporaries, he was not close to Test selection.

After 1963, Savage's wicket-taking powers declined and he did not achieve 100 wickets in a season again. By 1966, when Leicestershire were enjoying a revival under new captain Tony Lock, he took only 55 wickets in 27 matches. By this time, the county had recruited another off-spinner in Jack Birkenshaw, and Savage was released at the end of the 1966 season. He then joined his native Lancashire for three seasons, playing regularly in the first two, but retiring from first-class cricket at the age of 40 in 1969. He then remained with Lancashire for a further nine years as a coach and as captain of the second eleven.
