= William Odell (cricketer) =

English first-class cricketer (1881–1917)

Personal information
- Full name: William Ward Odell
- Born: 5 November 1881; Leicester, Leicestershire, England
- Died: 4 October 1917 (aged 35); Broodseinde, Passchendaele salient, Belgium
- Batting: Right-handed
- Bowling: Right-arm medium-pace
- Role: Bowler
- Relatives: Edwin Odell, brother

Domestic team information
- Years: Team
- 1901–14: Leicestershire
- 1902–04: London County
- First-class debut: 22 July 1901 Leicestershire v London County
- Last First-class: 1 September 1914 Leicestershire v Nottinghamshire

Career statistics
Competition	First-class
Matches	193
Runs scored	3368
Batting average	13.69
100s/50s	–/9
Top score	75
Balls bowled	38007
Wickets	738
Bowling average	23.59
5 wickets in innings	45
10 wickets in match	6
Best bowling	8/20
Catches/stumpings	88/–
- Source: CricketArchive, 28 July 2013

William Ward Odell MC (5 November 1881 – 4 October 1917) was an English first-class cricketer who played for Leicestershire. He was born in Leicester and was killed in action in the First World War at Broodseinde in the Passchendaele salient in Belgium.

== Family and background ==
Odell's father was Rev Joseph Odell, a Primitive Methodist minister who had ministries in Wales, Leicester, where William was born, Brooklyn in the US, and Birmingham, where he was in charge of the Conference Hall and where William was educated at the King Edward VI Camp Hill School for Boys. William's brother Edwin Odell also played first-class cricket for Leicestershire in one match.

== Cricket career ==
Odell played cricket as an amateur, and was a right-handed lower middle order batsman and a right-arm medium pace bowler. He made his first-class cricket debut in a game for Leicestershire against the London County Cricket Club, and his first bowling victim was W. G. Grace, caught on the long-on boundary. In the return match two weeks later he took nine wickets for 73 runs in the game, Grace again being one of his victims. And in the following Leicestershire game, against Warwickshire, he went one better with match figures of 10 wickets for 103 runs.

From 1902 to 1908, Odell was pretty much an ever-present in the Leicestershire side and the leading wicket-taker in several of those seasons, though he also appeared for other amateur teams, including London County and five times for Gentlemen in the series of matches between amateurs and professionals. In 1902, he took 89 wickets in games at an average of 26.41. They included seven Hampshire wickets for 33 runs, which remained his best bowling figures for four years. In his first ever match for London County in 1902, he took six second innings wickets against Marylebone Cricket Club (MCC), including Arthur Conan Doyle for a duck.

Odell took 100 wickets in a season for the first time in 1903 and repeated the feat in the next two seasons. His total of 112 wickets in 1904 was the best of his career and his batting improved markedly that season as well, with his 574 runs at an average of 17.39 being his best aggregate of runs in any one season. In 1906 he failed to reach 100 wickets, but his eight for 20 for Leicestershire against MCC at Lord's was the best innings return of his career. He was back over 100 wickets in 1907, and for the only time in his career he took more than 100 for Leicestershire; the bowling average of 17.72 was the best in his career. He was less successful in 1908, his total number of wickets falling to 74, and after the season was over a short notice in The Times announced that “owing to business engagements Mr. W. W. Odell will not be able to play for Leicestershire next season except during holidays". That proved true: Odell appeared only against the Australians in 1909, not at all in 1910 and 1911, only in Thomas Jayes’ benefit match in 1912, and then only occasional matches in his last two seasons.

== War service and death ==
At the time of his death, Odell was serving as a temporary second lieutenant with the ninth battalion of the Nottinghamshire and Derbyshire Regiment. Less than three weeks before his death he was cited in The London Gazette as having been awarded the Military Cross. The citation read:

For conspicuous gallantry and devotion to duty in taking out a patrol at a critical moment and gaining very valuable information, which resulted in bodies of the enemy who were massing for attack being dispersed by our artillery fire. Throughout all operations he has consistently displayed the utmost courage and coolness.

His address in his probate record was in South Yardley, Birmingham and he left a widow, Edith.
