= College Ground, Loughborough =

Cricket ground in Leicestershire, England

Coordinates: 52°46′09″N 1°13′40″W

College Ground
Ground information
- Location: Loughborough, Leicestershire
- Establishment: c. 1924

Team information
Leicestershire	(1928–1929)
- As of 19 October 2020; Source: Ground profile

The College Ground was a cricket ground based in the town of Loughborough, Leicestershire. Initially the ground was a playing field of the Loughborough Technical Institute, which was formed in 1909. First-class cricket was played at the ground twice in 1928 and 1929, with Leicestershire using the ground as an outground against Derbyshire in the 1928 County Championship and Glamorgan in the 1929 County Championship. Following the merger of the Loughborough College of Technology, Loughborough College of Education and Loughborough Training College and Loughborough College of Art and Design into The Union of Loughborough Colleges and subsequent application for university status by the College of Technology, there was a need for a permanent base for the Loughborough Students' Union. Land occupied by the College Ground was identified, with the Student Union building being constructed on it in 1979.

== First-class records ==
- Highest team total: 224 all out by Derbyshire v Leicestershire, 1947
- Lowest team total: 98 all out by Leicestershire v Glamorgan, 1929
- Highest individual innings: 121 by Stan Worthington for Derbyshire v Leicestershire, 1928
- Best bowling in an innings: 6–32 by George Geary for Leicestershire v Glamorgan, 1929
- Best bowling in a match: 10–74 by George Geary, as above

== See also ==
- List of Leicestershire County Cricket Club grounds
- List of cricket grounds in England and Wales
- Haslegrave Ground – current cricket ground at Loughborough University
