= Town Ground, Coalville =

Cricket ground

Coordinates: 52°43′36.88″N 1°20′59.48″W

Ground information
- Location: Coalville, Leicestershire
- Establishment: c. 1880

Team information
| Leicestershire | (1950) |
- As of 22 October 2020; Source: Ground profile

The Town Ground was a cricket ground in Coalville, Leicestershire. The ground was used as an outground by Leicestershire in 1950, with Leicestershire playing one first-class match there against Warwickshire in the County Championship. Despite a century from Leicestershire's Charles Palmer (143), Warwickshire won the match by 6 wickets, thanks in part to Abdul Hafeez Kardar's 5 for 25 in Leicestershire's second innings of 83 all out.

== See also ==
- List of Leicestershire County Cricket Club grounds
- List of cricket grounds in England and Wales
