= Coventry Road =

Cricket ground in Leicestershire, England

Coventry Road Cricket Ground
- Interactive map of Coventry Road Cricket Ground

Ground information
- Location: Hinckley, Leicestershire
- Country: England
- Coordinates: 52.5404°N 1.3767°W
- Establishment: 1946
- Capacity: 3,500

Team information
Leicestershire	(1951–1964)
- As of 20 June 2012; Source: Ground profile

Coventry Road Cricket Ground was a cricket ground in Hinckley, Leicestershire. It was located along Coventry Road to the south, Trinity Lane to the east, with Trinity Vicarage Road to the north. Established in 1946, the ground had a capacity of 3,500.

== History ==
The ground built after the Ashby Road ground ceased the host cricket matches shortly before World War II, leaving Hinckley without a venue for first-class cricket. Local businessmen subsequently joined forces to raise funds for construction of a new ground, with a Mr. Arthur Tansey donating three fields along the Coventry Road, upon which a pitch and pavilion was built. First-class cricket returned to Hinckley in 1951, when Leicestershire played Derbyshire in the County Championship. From 1952 to 1957, Leicestershire played two first-class matches per season at the ground. Leicestershire didn't play in 1956, but returned the following season, where they proceeded to play one match per season until 1961. Two first-class matches were played in 1962, although Leicestershire didn't visit in 1963. The final two first-class matches to be held at the ground came in 1964, with Leicestershire playing Somerset and Kent. Seventeen first-class matches were played in total, with Leicestershire winning just once, losing eleven and drawing five.

Subsequently demolished, the site was used for a leisure centre.

== Records ==
=== First-class ===
- Highest team total: 372 by Warwickshire v Leicestershire, 1954
- Lowest team total: 42 by Leicestershire v Lancashire, 1955
- Highest individual innings: 182* by Jim Stewart for Warwickshire v Leicestershire, 1962
- Best bowling in an innings: 6-20 by Brian Statham for Lancashire v Leicestershire, 1955
- Best bowling in a match: 9-66 by Brian Statham, as above
