= Brush Ground =

Former cricket ground in Loughborough, England

Coordinates: 52°45′54.88″N 1°12′41.25″W

Ground information
- Location: Loughborough, Leicestershire
- Establishment: c. 1951

Team information
Leicestershire	(1953–1965)
- As of 25 October 2020; Source: Ground profile

The Brush Ground was a cricket ground in Loughborough, Leicestershire. Owned by the Brush Electrical Machines Company and used by the company cricket team, it was used as an outground by Leicestershire. They first played there in a first-class match against Hampshire in the 1953 County Championship. Leicestershire played there at least once a year (with the exception of 1964) until 1965, playing sixteen first-class matches. The ground was later purchased by Leicestershire County Council in 2017, with the ground redeveloped for residential purposes. The sports club moved to new premises three–times the size Nanpantan Road in Loughborough.

== First-class records ==
- Highest team total: 426 all out by Surrey v Leicestershire, 1953
- Lowest team total: 36 all out by Leicestershire v Derbyshire, 1965
- Highest individual innings: 135 by Eric Bedser for Surrey v Leicestershire, 1953
- Best bowling in an innings: 10–78 by Tony Pearson for Cambridge University v Leicestershire, 1961
- Best bowling in a match: 14–119 by Butch White, for Hampshire v Leicestershire, 1963

== See also ==
- List of Leicestershire County Cricket Club grounds
- List of cricket grounds in England and Wales
