= Leicester Road =

Cricket ground in Hinckley, Leicestershire

Coordinates: 52°33′28″N 1°20′31″W

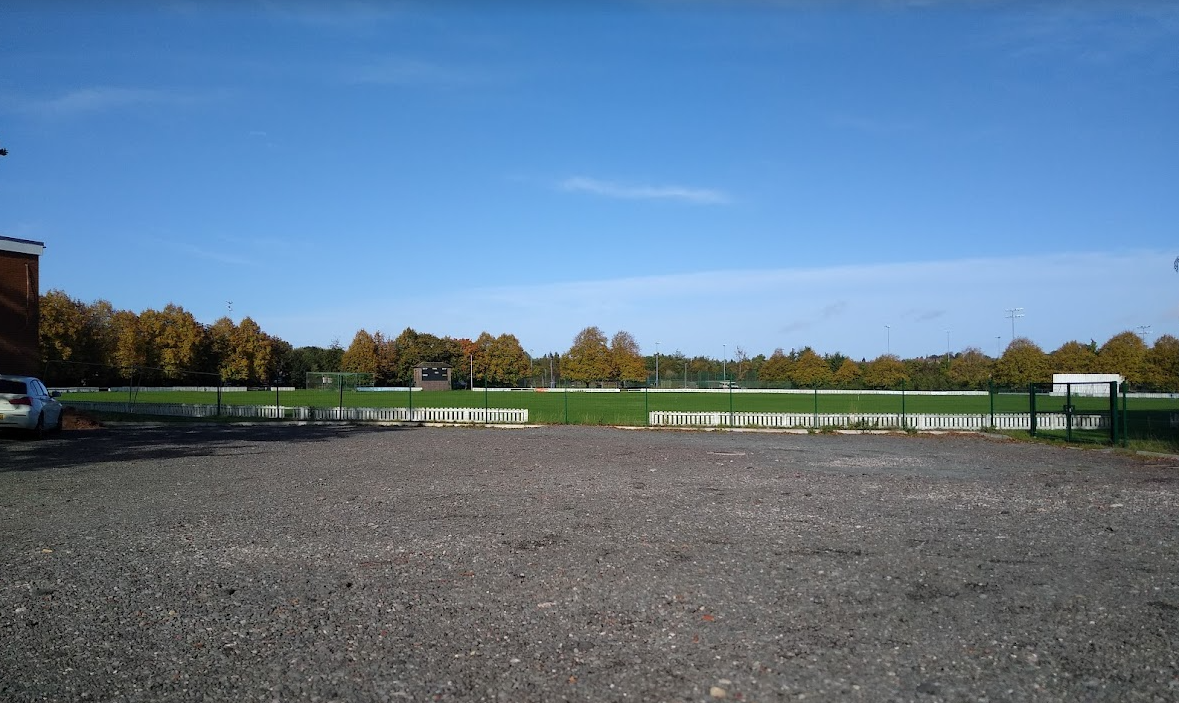
- Interactive map of Leicester Road

Ground information
- Location: Hinckley, Leicestershire
- Country: England

International information
- Only women's ODI: 27 August 1997: England v South Africa

Team information
Leicestershire	(1981–1991)
- As of 19 October 2023; Source: CricketArchive

The Leicester Road Ground is a cricket ground based in the town of Hinckley, Leicestershire. It has, in the past, been used by Leicestershire as an outground and has held 11 first class games in total. The first game took place in 1981 against Nottinghamshire and the last in 1991 against Gloucestershire.

There is also a football stadium on Leicester Road Hinckley which is host to Leicester Road Football Club and Leicester Falcons American Football Club. Part of this stadium was acquired by former HUFC directors under dubious circumstances. The majority of the site is owned by Downes pension fund, The Powers Trust and a local businessman who is the chair of Hinckley AFC. The small part of the site allegedly owned by Leicester Road Stadium comprises the pitch and some car parking. A police investigation for fraud was not carried through to a prosecution as they decided it was not in the public interest to continue. There is an outstanding appeal against this decision.

The ground is now used as the home ground for Premier League side, Hinckley Town Cricket Club, as well as the City Cricket Academy games, due to both organisations involvement with Anshuman Bhagawati, who owns the Academy. The ground is also used as an outground for the Leicestershire 2nd XI, with several fixtures being held here during the midweek.

The Leicester Road sports ground also has facilities for rugby and squash to be played, as well as the tennis courts. With limited parking onsite, for major events, the clubhouse has the option of parking at the adjoined football ground.

Not to be confused with the home ground of Hinckley Amateurs Cricket Club.
