= 1970 John Player League =

- Administrator(s): Test and County Cricket Board
- Cricket format: Limited overs cricket (40 overs per innings)
- Tournament format(s): League
- Champions: Lancashire (2nd title)
- Participants: 17
- Matches: 136
- Most runs: 625 Harry Pilling (Lancashire)
- Most wickets: 32 Bob Woolmer (Kent)

The 1970 John Player League was the second competing of what was generally known as the Sunday League. The competition was won for the second consecutive year by Lancashire County Cricket Club.

== Standings ==
Team	Pld	W	L	N/R	A	Pts	R/R
Lancashire (C)	16	13	2	1	0	53	5.14
Kent	16	12	4	0	0	48	4.78
Derbyshire	16	11	5	0	0	44	4.42
Essex	16	8	5	2	1	35	4.52
Warwickshire	16	8	6	1	1	34	4.43
Worcestershire	16	8	7	1	0	33	4.15
Leicestershire	16	7	7	0	2	30	4.59
Gloucestershire	16	7	7	0	2	30	4.34
Surrey	16	7	7	2	0	30	4.16
Nottinghamshire	16	7	9	0	0	28	4.04
Middlesex	16	6	8	1	1	26	4.44
Hampshire	16	6	10	0	0	24	4.64
Northamptonshire	16	6	10	0	0	24	4.18
Yorkshire	16	5	9	2	0	22	4.2
Somerset	16	5	9	1	1	22	4.1
Glamorgan	16	5	9	0	2	22	3.85
Sussex	16	3	10	1	2	15	4.3
Team marked (C) finished as champions. Source: CricketArchive

== Batting averages ==
Player	County	Matches	Innings	Runs	Average	Highest Score	100s	50s
Barry Richards	Hampshire	12	11	592	65.77	155*	3	0
Clive Lloyd	Lancashire	14	14	521	57.88	134*	1	2
Harry Pilling	Lancashire	16	15	625	52.08	85	0	5
Brian Luckhurst	Kent	11	11	520	52.00	142	1	3
Pasty Harris	Nottinghamshire	16	16	596	45.84	104*	1	4
Bryan Davis	Glamorgan	13	13	535	44.58	74	0	6
Mike Denness	Kent	16	16	582	41.57	94*	0	4
Qualification: 400 runs. Source: CricketArchive

== Bowling averages ==
Player	County	Balls	Wickets	Average	Economy	BBI	4wi	5wi
Ken Shuttleworth	Lancashire	553	24	11.04	2.87	4/3	1	0
Keith Boyce	Essex	573	28	12.39	3.63	4/27	1	0
Jack Simmons	Lancashire	601	26	14.07	3.65	3/8	0	0
David Hughes	Lancashire	496	24	14.50	4.20	5/26	1	1
Bob Woolmer	Kent	727	32	16.87	4.45	4/39	1	0
Derek Underwood	Kent	597	24	17,350	4.22	5/25	1	1
Mike Taylor	Nottinghamshire	705	24	19.83	4.05	4/26	1	0
Qualification: 24 wickets. Source: CricketArchive

== See also ==
Sunday League
