= Leicester power station =

Former power station in Leicester, England

Leicester power stations
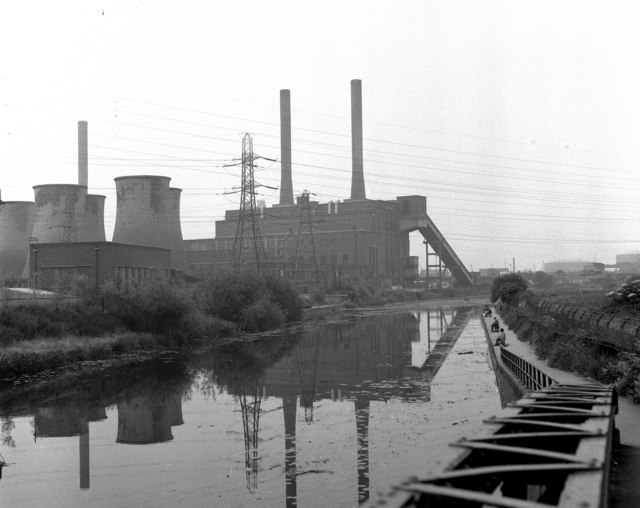
- Freemans Meadow power station in 1975
- Country: United Kingdom
- Location: Leicester
- Coordinates: 52°37′11″N 01°08′36″W
- Status: Decommissioned and demolished
- Construction began: 1893
- Commission date: 1894, 1904, 1922, 1976
- Decommission date: 1928, 1930, 1976, 1990
- Owners: Leicester Corporation (1894-1948); British Electricity Authority (1948–1955); Central Electricity Authority (1955–1957); Central Electricity Generating Board (1958–1989); Powergen (1990–1993)
- Operator: As owner

Thermal power station
- Primary fuel: Coal
- Secondary fuel: Fuel oil (gas turbines)
- Turbine technology: Steam turbines
- Chimneys: 3 (Freemans Meadow), 2 (gas turbine)
- Cooling towers: 6
- Cooling source: River or canal water plus cooling towers

Power generation
- Make and model: see text
- Nameplate capacity: 131 MW (steam), 102 MW (gas turbine)
- Annual net output: 561 GWh (1955)

External links
- Commons: Related media on Commons

Leicester power stations are a series of electricity generating stations that have provided electric power to the City of Leicester and the wider area from 1894. The first station, located within Aylestone gas works, supplied electricity for street lighting. The city's new electric tram system was supplied from 1904 by a station at Lero which operated until 1930. A large coal-fired power station was constructed at Freemans Meadow in 1922 and was operational until 1976. Finally a gas turbine power plant was commissioned in 1976.

== Background ==
Leicester was one of first nine municipalities to obtain legal powers to provide street lighting in the town. The authority to do this was provided for under the Leicester Corporation Act 1879 (42 & 43 Vict. c. cc). However, little progress was made with the new technology. The Corporation of Leicester obtained, from the Board of Trade, a provisional electric lighting order in 1890 permitting it to generate electricity and supply electric lighting for the town. The Leicester Electric Lighting Order 1890 was confirmed by Parliament by the Electric Lighting Order Confirmation (No. 7) Act 1890 (53 & 54 Vict. c. cxcii).

== Aylestone Road power station ==
The first power station in Leicester was built in 1894 within the gas works site on Aylestone Road (52°37′00.1″N 1°08′32.0″W). It first provided electricity on 19 December 1894. In 1897 the plant had a generating capacity of 675 kW and the maximum load was 515 kW. A total of 262.179 MWh of electricity was sold to 331 customers which powered 26,512 lamps, this provided an income to the corporation of £6,056-12-9.

By 1923 the station comprised three 1 MW reciprocating engines and a 5 MW turbo-alternator. These machines were powered by total of up to 181,000 pounds per hour (22.8 kg/s) of steam from coal-fired boilers. The machines generated alternating current (AC) supplied at 240 & 415 V and 100 & 200 V. The electricity works were decommissioned in 1928 after the new power station at Freemans Meadow had been built.

== Midland Railway Station ==
In 1894 the Midland Railway Company installed a gas-fired power station in Leicester. This used two Dowson gas producers working on anthracite, the gas produced operated six single cylinder Crossley engines with porcelain tube ignition. Three machines drove 60-lamp Brush arc lighting generators and the other three drove 110 Volt direct current dynamos for incandescent lights. The total output of the station was 274 MWh per year. The Midland railway station and the goods yards were lit by 141 arc lights and 288 incandescent lamps. The system was reported to have run for many years.

== Lero power station ==
Leicester's tram system was first built in 1874 using horse drawn cars. The Corporation of Leicester took over the system in 1901 and converted it to electric power in 1904. To meet this demand a new generating station was constructed on Painter Street (52°38′42.0″N 1°07′47.2″W) the station buildings, comprising a boiler house and an engine room, were known as the Lero building. It was located next to the Grand Union Canal to facilitate the supply of coal by barge and for the availability of cooling water. The power station was officially opened on 18 May 1904. The boiler house was 108 ft long and 77 ft wide (32.9 m by 23.5 m). In 1904 there were four Yates and Thom Lancashire type boilers, these were 33 ft long and 8 ft 5 inches diameter (10 m by 2.5 m). The tapered octagonal brick chimney was 186 ft high (56.7 m).

The engine room adjoining the boiler house was 118 ft long, 60 ft wide and 40 ft high (36 m by 18.2 m, by 12.2 m). There were three 500 kW steam generating sets. The engines were Yates and Thom vertical cross-compound Corliss condensing type. The principal specifications of the engines were:

- 160 pounds per square inch (11.0 bar) steam working pressure
- cylinders: bore high pressure 22 inches (559 cm), low pressure 44 inches (1118 cm), stroke 3 ft (914 cm).
- flywheel: 16 feet (4.88 m) diameter, 95 rpm, 25 tons
- Dick-Kerr 500 kW Compound Wound generator 500–550 V DC.

There was a separate battery room which supplied additional current when the demand on the system was high.

In 1906 additional plant was added raising the capacity to 3 × 500 kW and 1 × 1,000 kW generators. There was sufficient generating capacity to allow up to 20 percent of the electricity produced to be sold to industry throughout Leicester. Electricity was delivered to consumer's premises by overhead wires and the return current through the tram track completed the circuit. In 1910 the engine room was extended by 54 ft (11 m) and a Willans & Robinson turbine and a Siemens 1,000 kW DC generator were commissioned. To meet the demand for alternating current (AC), a 750 kW alternator driven by a direct current (DC) motor was also installed.

The Lero and the Aylestone generating sites were electrically coupled in 1914, and were managed by the Tramways and Electricity Committee of the corporation. As Leicester expanded so did the demand for electricity.

By 1923 the plant at the Lero station had been increased to 2 × 3 MW turbo-alternators generating AC; 3 × 0.5 MW and 1 × 1 MW reciprocating engines plus 1 × 0.75 MW steam turbine all generating direct current (DC). The machines at Lero were supplied with up to 164,000 pounds per hour (20.7 kg/s) of steam from the coal-fired boilers.

The Lero station was closed on 30 June 1930, when electricity generation was centralised at Freemans Meadow power station. The buildings were used from 1946 as an extension for the Leicester College of Technology; they were eventually demolished in 2010.

== Freemans Meadow power station ==
Following the First World War, and in anticipation of a post-war increase in demand for electricity, the Corporation of Leicester built a central power station at Freemans Meadow (52°37′10.6″N 1°08′35.7″W). This is now the site of Leicester City Football Club's King Power Stadium. The station opened in December 1922 and was also known as Raw Dykes Road power station. The tram system was fed from a 3-phase electricity supply via rotary converters. These converters were located at Sanvey Gate and Newarke St. The new station initially had a 10 MW turbo-alternator and a 500 kW house service set supplied with up to 196,000 pounds per hour (24.7 kg/s) of steam from eight 45,000 lb/h coal-fired boilers.

=== Three power stations, 1923 ===
The three operational power stations – Aylestone, Lero and Freemans Meadow – supplying electricity to Leicester simultaneously in 1923 had a total generating capacity of 27.25 MW. The total output of the stations in 1921-23 was:

Leicester power stations electricity output
Year	Output, GWh
1921	25.219
1922	24.214
1923	30.714

At this time the maximum load on the system was 19.08 MW, and there was a connected load of 29,148 kW. The electric current sold was put to the following uses:

Electricity use, 1923
Use	Current sold, MWh	Current, %
Lighting and domestic	4,598	15.0
Public lighting	47	0.1
Traction	7,956	25.9
Power	18,113	59.0
Bulk supply	0.0	0.0
Total	30,714	100.0

The total revenue to the corporation from sales of electricity in 1923 was £292,437, making a surplus of revenue over expenditure of £121,113.

=== Freemans Meadow LP station ===
New plant was installed at Freemans Meadow over the period 1928–39, this was known as the low pressure (LP) station. It comprised the following:

Boilers:

- 3 × International Combustion Company, pulverised coal fired, each 120,000 lb/hr (15.1 kg/s) of steam at 350 psi and 750 °F (24.1 bar and 399 °C).
- 3 × International Combustion Company, pulverised coal fired, each 175,000 lb/hr (22.0 kg/s) of steam at 360 psi and 800 °F (24.8 bar and 427 °C).

Turbo-alternators:

- 1 × 18.75 MW Oerlikon, 6.6 kV
- 1 × 25 MW English Electric, 6.6 kV
- 1 × 30 MW Parsons, 33 kV
- 1 × 1.5 MW English Electric house set

All machines ran at 3,000 rpm, generating 3-phase current at 50 Hz.

In the 1920s the British equipment manufacturers operated 'price maintenance rings' to keep prices high. Leicester Corporation obtained the Oerlikon machine from the Swiss manufacturers at a considerable saving. This was in the face of opposition from trade unions and business interests to buy British equipment.

Cooling water for the condensers was abstracted from the River Soar. Supplementary cooling was by six Mitchell cooling towers with an aggregate capacity of 4.2 million gallons per hour (5.3 m^{3}/s).

Following the construction of the national grid in 1928–33, a 132 kV substation was built to the north of Freemans Meadow power station (52°37′21.0″N 1°08′27.7″W).

During the Second World War the cooling towers were painted with camouflage.

The key operating parameters of the LP station in 1954–58 were:

Freemans Meadow LP station
Year	Output capacity, MW	Running hours (load factor %)	Units sent out, GWh	Thermal efficiency, %
1946		(42.9 %)	300.26	19.73
1954	75	4935	173.441	18.23
1955	75	4830	177.248	18.68
1956	75	4743	157.944	18.53
1957	71	4924	155.898	18.88
1958	71	3538	87.294	17.68

=== Nationalisation ===
Upon nationalisation of the British electricity supply industry in 1948 the ownership of Leicester power station was vested in the British Electricity Authority, and subsequently the Central Electricity Authority and the Central Electricity Generating Board (CEGB). The electricity distribution and sales functions were vested in the East Midlands Electricity Board.

=== Freemans Meadow HP station ===
Following the Second World War high pressure (HP) plant was installed in Freemans Meadow in 1949–50 by the British Electricity Authority. This comprised:

Boilers:

- 4 × International Combustion Company, pulverised coal fired, each 175,000 lb/hr (22.0 kg/s) of steam at 660 psi and 810 °F (45.5 bar and 432 °C).

Turbo-alternators:

- 2 × 31.5 MW Richardson-Westgarth-English Electric 13.2 kV. The first set was commissioned in August 1950.

Cooling water for the condensers was abstracted from the River Soar. Supplementary cooling was by two Concrete Piling cooling towers each with a capacity of 1.35 million gallons per hour (1.71 m^{3}/s).

The key operating parameters of the HP station in 1954–8 were:

Freemans Meadow HP station
Year	Output capacity, MW	Running hours	Units sent out, GWh	Thermal efficiency, %
1954	60	8218	377.963	24.74
1955	60	8320	384.093	24.87
1956	60	7724	360.269	24.65
1957	60	7347	331.372	24.58
1958	60	5752	265.233	24.48

The total electricity output (HP and LP) and operating parameters of Freemans Meadow power station from 1961–71 was as follows:

Freemans Meadow station
Year	Max output capacity, MW	Load factor, %	Units sent out, GWh	Thermal efficiency, %
1961	131	30.5	349.682	21.23
1962	131	30.8	353.52	21.87
1963	131	34.13	391.734	21.71
1967	131	34.5	393.277	21.16
1971	90	23.4	184.796	22.22

In 1962-64 there were concerns about dust emissions from the station. This was investigated by the Air Pollution and Smoke Abatement division of the Ministry of Housing and Local Government.

Two former workers at Freemans Meadow power station (George Brown and Leonard Richardson) have given oral history accounts of their time there.

The coal-fired station at Freemans Meadow was closed on 25 October 1976. It was subsequently demolished.

== Gas turbine station ==
In 1972 the CEGB planned to build 12 gas turbine power stations totalling 2,550 MW. These would be used to provide main power generation rather than for peak-shaving. The first station was commissioned at Freemans Meadow Leicester in December 1976, these used industrial type gas turbines rather aero derivative types. Leicester had two 51 MW GEC Gas Turbine EM 610 fuel oil fired industrial gas turbines. The station had two steel chimneys. The operating parameters of the gas turbine station were as follows.

Leicester gas turbine station
Year	Max output capacity, MW	Load factor, %	Units sent out, GWh	Thermal efficiency, %
1979	102	2.8	24.657	20.95
1981	102	0.3	2.353	10.5
1982	102	0.6	5.158	20.07
1985	102	19.7	175.697	24.81
1986	102	0.5	4.606	19.34

The load factor data demonstrates that the power station was not used significantly. The high output in 1984/5 was associated with the 1984/5 Miners' Strike, and the shortage of coal for coal-fired power stations.

There was a proposal to develop a district heating scheme for Leicester in 1986, using waste heat from the gas-turbines at Freemans Meadow power station. However, the development was not taken forward.

The power station was still operated by the CEGB in 1989 but was decommissioned in 1993 and demolished.

The 132 kV electricity sub-station north of the site is still operational (2020).
