= John King (cricketer, born 1871) =

English cricketer (1871–1946)

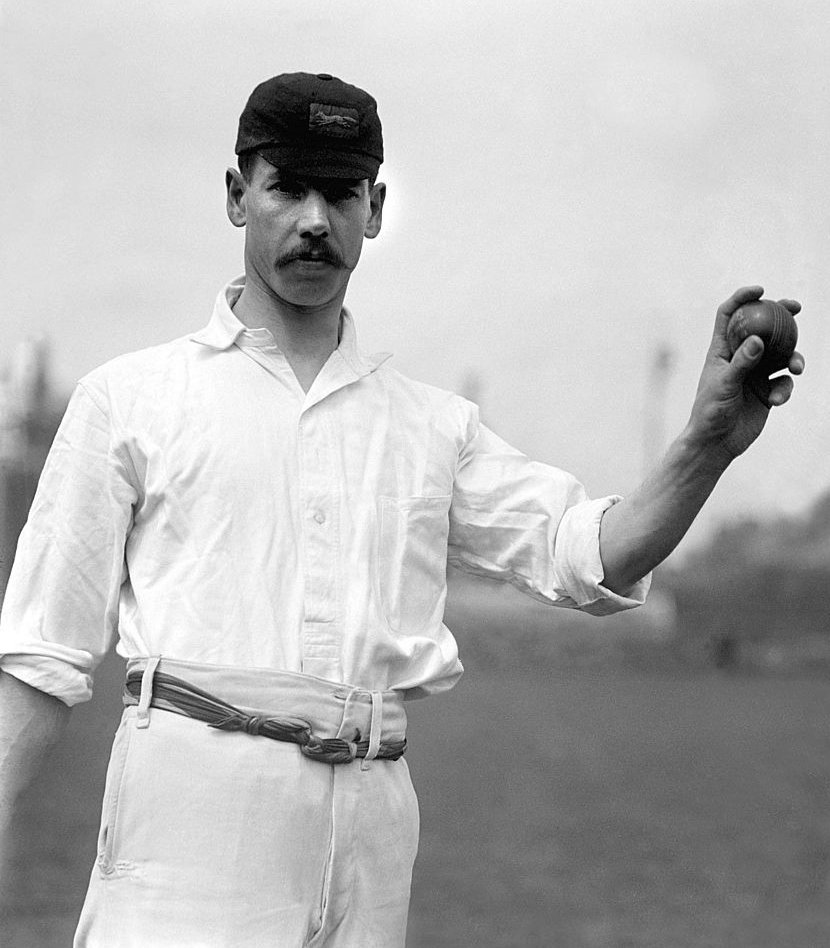
- King in about 1905

Personal information
- Born: 16 April 1871; Lutterworth, Leicestershire, England
- Died: 18 November 1946 (aged 75); Denbigh, Wales
- Batting: Left-handed
- Bowling: Left-arm medium

International information
- National side: England
- Only Test: 14 June 1909 v Australia

Career statistics
Competition	Test	First-class
Matches	1	552
Runs scored	64	25,122
Batting average	32.00	27.33
100s/50s	0/1	34/130
Top score	60	227*
Balls bowled	162	70,187
Wickets	1	1,204
Bowling average	99.00	25.17
5 wickets in innings	0	69
10 wickets in match	0	11
Best bowling	1/99	8/17
Catches/stumpings	0/0	340/0
- Source: CricInfo, 17 September 2019

John Herbert King (16 April 1871 – 18 November 1946) was a cricketer who played first-class cricket for Leicestershire County Cricket Club between 1895 and 1925. He also played one Test match for England against Australia at Lord's in 1909.

== Early career ==
King first played for Leicestershire without success – just seventeen runs in eight innings and no wicket – in their initial County Championship season of 1895. He did not play at all in 1896, and only played five games in 1897 for 169 runs and just two wickets for 114 each. In 1898 King appeared to have established himself as a regular player, but duties as a professional in Birkenhead subsequently prevented him playing.

== Established county player ==
He disappointed upon returning for the full 1899 season, but in 1900 he improved dramatically. Discarding the cramped, one-stroke style of his early days, King emerged as an attacking left-haded batsman to such effect that he scored 940 runs, whilst at same time his medium-pace left-arm bowling brought him 76 wickets in county matches. King could bowl accurately with varied flight, but like virtually all English spin bowlers of this era was severely lacking in finger spin except under exceedingly helpful conditions.

In 1901 King scored over 1,600 runs in first-class cricket, and although his bowling disappointed in the following two cool, wet seasons, he continued to pass four figures with bat. In 1904, King was listed as a reserve for the Players against the Gentlemen at Lord's, but played due to the absence of Johnny Tyldesley and scored two separate centuries on a fiery pitch, becoming only the second player to do so in that game. (Note: R. E. Foster in 1900 had been the first.) However, a thumb injury early in 1905 ruled him out of contention for a Test berth against the Australians, although he did get back to form with the bat when he returned.

In 1906 King became the last batsman to have been given out hit the ball twice in a first-class game in England, when in the match against Surrey at the Oval he stopped the ball from running onto his stumps by hitting it a second time, and then attempted to run a single. King like his county had a poor season that year, but despite limited opportunities he showed something of his earlier promise with the ball in the wet summer of 1907, averaging under 17 for 40 wickets.

== Playing for England ==
In 1909, King did so well early in the season with both bat and ball that he was asked to play for England against Australia at Lord's when Colin Blythe – who had taken eleven wickets at Edgbaston in the first Test – declared himself unavailable due to ill-health and a left-handed bowler was needed in unsettled weather. King was the first Leicestershire cricketer to represent England against Australia at home, and scored 60 in the first innings. However, he was not retained with the return of C. B. Fry for the Third Test and would never play for England again.

In 1910, King had a benefit against Nottinghamshire, but his season was almost entirely wiped out by a knee injury sustained in a local game in May. He played just two games and his bowling was severely missed in a wet summer by a team that had lost W. W. Odell to business. In 1911 King was mostly expensive and at times bowled badly on the few helpful pitches of an extremely dry and hot summer – notably against Kent in May. Nonetheless, on a particularly vicious "sticky" against Yorkshire he helped Leicestershire to their only victory with a remarkable performance of seven wickets for no run in twenty balls as the northern county were bowled out for 47 and lost by an innings and twenty runs. In the extremely wet summer of 1912, King took 100 wickets for the first time and achieve his only "double", but with Woolley and Dean bowling effectively for England he had no chance of regaining his Test berth. In 1913 King completely lost his bowling even on the few favourable wickets, taking only 27 wickets, but he batted very well and in 1914 scored 227 against an admittedly bad Worcestershire bowling attack.

== Postwar veteran ==
King remained a mainstay of Leicestershire cricket when county matches resumed in 1919. He took 100 wickets in county matches in 1920, but after that his bowling declined. However, despite passing fifty in 1921, King scored a thousand runs each season from 1921 to 1923, in which season he was granted a second benefit against Derbyshire and scored his second career double century with 205 against Hampshire, where he achieved a remarkable feat of endurance for a man of fifty-two by batting throughout the second day. At the time the oldest man playing regularly in county cricket, (Note: R. H. Moss played one game for Worcestershire at the age of fifty-seven in King's last season of 1925.) King declined with both bat and ball in the wet summer of 1924 and finally dropped out of the team at fifty-four in 1925.

== Post-playing ==
After retiring as a player, King continued his involvement in the game as an umpire for another eleven seasons.
