= Albert Knight (cricketer) =

English cricketer

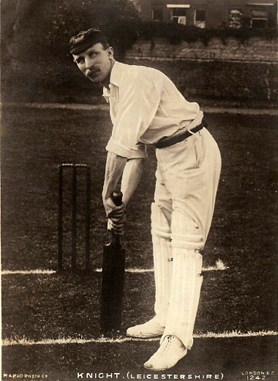

Personal information
- Full name: Albert Ernest Knight
- Born: 8 October 1872; Leicester, England
- Died: 25 April 1946 (aged 73); Edmonton, Middlesex, England
- Batting: Right-handed

International information
- National side: England
- Test debut (cap 141): 1 January 1904 v Australia
- Last Test: 8 March 1904 v Australia

Domestic team information
- Years: Team
- 1895–1912: Leicestershire
- 1903–1904: London County

Career statistics
| Competition | Test | First-class |
|---|---|---|
| Matches | 3 | 391 |
| Runs scored | 81 | 19,357 |
| Batting average | 16.20 | 29.24 |
| 100s/50s | 0/1 | 34/91 |
| Top score | 70* | 229* |
| Balls bowled | – | 156 |
| Wickets | – | 4 |
| Bowling average | – | 29.25 |
| 5 wickets in innings | – | 0 |
| 10 wickets in match | – | 0 |
| Best bowling | – | 2/34 |
| Catches/stumpings | 1/– | 133/– |
- Source: Cricinfo, 30 September 2009

Albert Ernest Knight (8 October 1872 – 25 April 1946) was an English professional cricket player. He was educated at Wyggeston Grammar School for Boys.

From 1895 until 1912 he played for Leicestershire as a somewhat dour batsman in a generally weak team. He represented England in three matches of the 1903–04 Ashes series against Australia, with a highest score of 70 not out at Sydney. He had had his most successful domestic season in 1903, scoring 1834 runs at an average of 45.85, including his highest score of 229 not out against Worcestershire.

A. A. Thomson saw his innings of 147 against Yorkshire at Sheffield when Leicestershire were following-on, made in his final season of 1912. He wrote: "His batting was unencumbered by frills, but strong and solid, attuned to the difficulties of the situation. Albert was a man of admirable character and a Methodist local preacher."

His most important contribution to the game was a book, The Complete Cricketer, published in 1906. Sir Derek Birley, in his A Social History of English Cricket, described it as "a masterpiece of its kind, stuffed full of learned observations in weighty prose". Wisden called it "grandiose in style, containing much startling metaphor".

After retirement, Knight was cricket coach at Highgate School, where his portrait in oils was painted by the art teacher, Kyffin Williams.
