= Bath Grounds =

Cricket grounds in Leicestershire

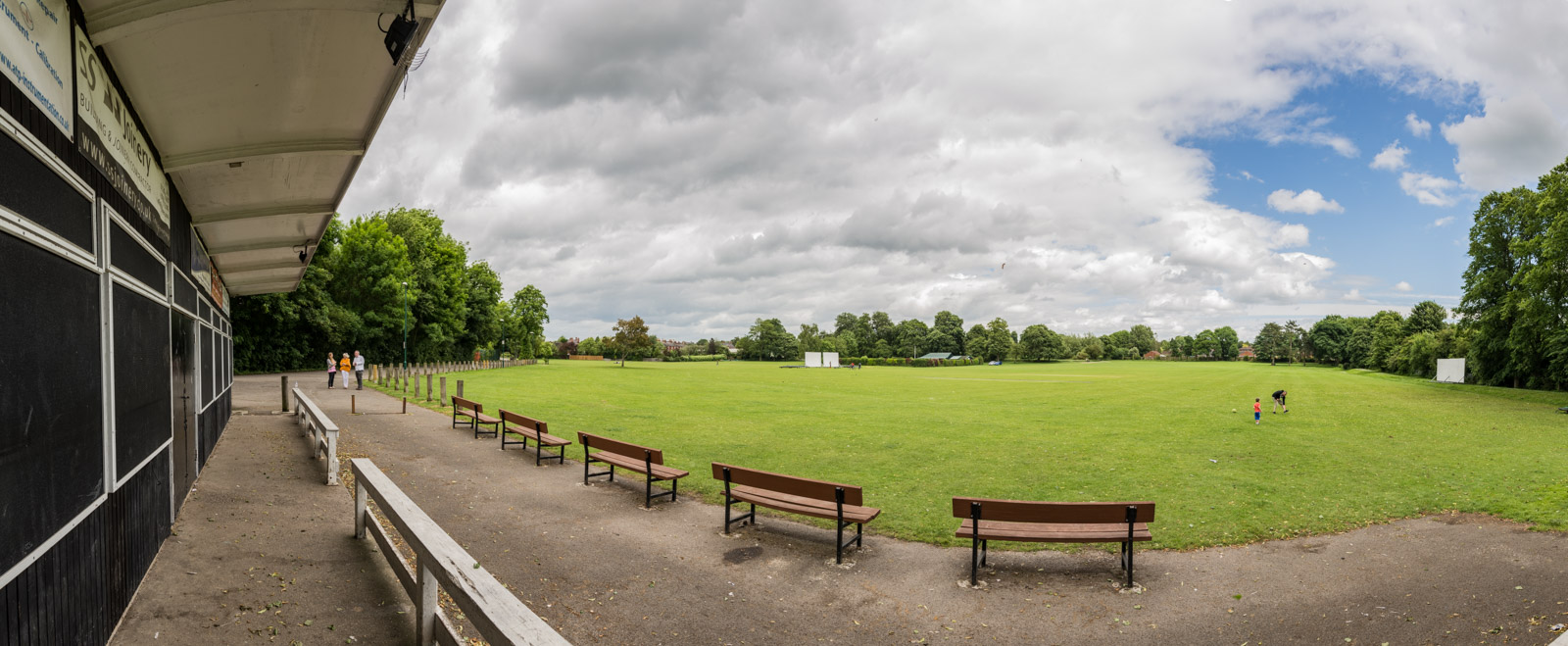
- Interactive map of Bath Grounds

Ground information
- Location: Ashby-de-la-Zouch, Leicestershire
- Country: England
- Coordinates: 52.7435°N 1.4719°W
- Establishment: c. 1845

Team information
Leicestershire	(1912–1964)
- As of 11 September 2023; Source: Ground profile

The Bath Grounds is a historic recreational ground and cricket ground based in the town of Ashby-de-la-Zouch, Leicestershire. It is home to Ashby Hastings Cricket Club and Ashby Bowls Club. The grounds are subject to conservation area protection. and are designated a "sensitive area" in retained policy E1 of the most recent Local Plan.

== Heritage ==
The Bath Grounds get their name from the Ivanhoe Baths, a Neo-classical Spa building designed by Robert Chaplin and built by the 1st Marquis of Hastings. The spa opened in 1822 and was named after the Sir Walter Scott novel Ivanhoe which mentions the local area. The land to the east of the Baths was laid out as an area of fashionable ‘greensward’ for the benefit of visitors to the Baths. This landscaped area consisted of a carriage drive and walks, used for sedate and genteel recreation. By the turn of the century a more formal organisation of recreation was reflected in the establishment of tennis courts, a croquet lawn and a bowls green and use of the area by the Ivanhoe Archery club and Deer's Leap Gun Club. By 1926 the Grounds had become an established venue for hockey and cricket clubs. The adjacent Royal Hotel, opened in 1827, was originally built to accommodate the rapidly increasing number of visitors to the spa. The Ivanhoe Baths were closed on 22 March 1884, caused by falling visitor numbers due to the new preference for seaside resorts over spa resorts. The buildings remained unused and gradually decayed, eventually being demolished almost 60 years later for health and safety reasons. The Royal Hotel remained, standing to the West of the Bath Grounds, and was granted a Grade II listed building status in 1950. Remnants of the spa buildings are still visible within the Bath Grounds, including stone fragments from the columns, pediments and cornices.

== Cricket ==
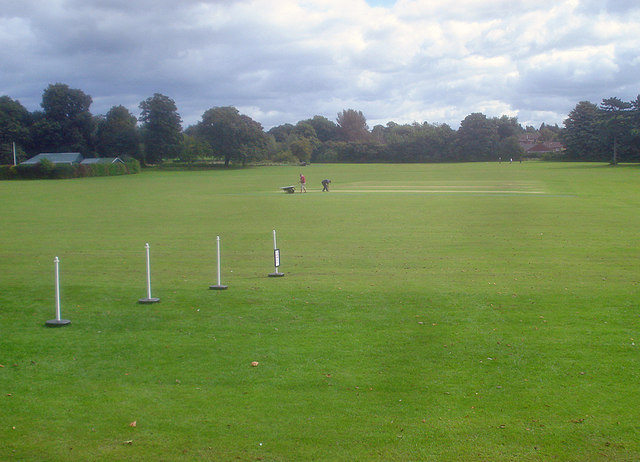
The Bath Grounds were used by Leicestershire for first-class cricket until 1964

The Bath Grounds is home to Ashby Hastings Cricket Club. It is also historically known for hosting Leicestershire County Cricket Club.

== Other uses ==
The Bath Grounds is also used for other sports such as hockey and bowls, as well as local events including the starting point of the Ashby 20 Road Race, the annual tribute band Fake Festival and other local festivals.

== Controversies ==
The Bath Grounds has recently been at the centre of a controversial development dispute, in which it was proposed by Oaklands Hotels Ltd - owners of the grounds and adjacent Royal Hotel - that five houses be built on the grounds, covering around a fifth of the available green space. The proposals were met with fierce local opposition, including petitions, objection letters, local media coverage and the formation of a "Friends of Ashby Bath Grounds" community group with a Facebook page and website. In the face of this opposition and objections from Sport England, English Heritage, the Environment Agency and Ashby Town Council, the proposal to build houses was withdrawn during August 2014. However the owner still plans to extend the Royal Hotel including two new buildings that many local residents and the Town Council feel are unsightly and out of keeping with the Grade II* listed building.

== Ownership ==
As mentioned above, the Bath Grounds and Royal Hotel are owned by Oakland Hotels Ltd. This company, whose sole directors are Simon Dawson, a local property developer, and a Klaus Bach, purchased them from Allied Sanif in 2011. Until 1999 they were owned by Bass Hotels. For many years the Bath Grounds have been leased by the hotel owners to Ashby Town Council to operate as a public park for the community. Each lease has been subject to a right of renewal. The Town Council sub leases areas of the grounds to Ashby Hastings Cricket Club and to Ashby Bowls Club for their pavilions and pitches.

The current Town Council lease expires on 21 June 2023 and contains a renewal clause for a further 28 years.
