= George Geary =

English cricketer (1893–1981)

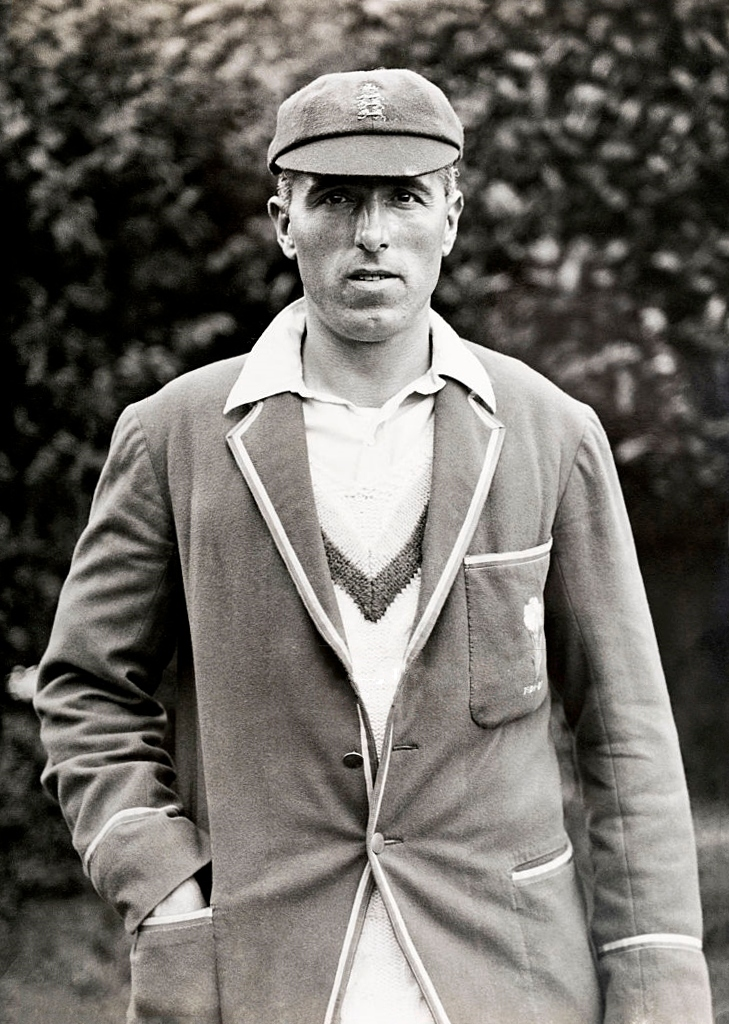

Personal information
- Born: 9 July 1893; Barwell, Leicestershire, England
- Died: 6 March 1981 (aged 87); Leicester, England
- Batting: Right-handed
- Bowling: Right-arm fast-medium

International information
- National side: England
- Test debut: 10 July 1924 v South Africa
- Last Test: 25 June 1934 v Australia

Career statistics
Competition	Test	First-class
Matches	14	549
Runs scored	249	13,501
Batting average	15.56	19.79
100s/50s	0/2	8/54
Top score	66	122
Balls bowled	3,810	116,292
Wickets	46	2,063
Bowling average	29.41	20.03
5 wickets in innings	4	125
10 wickets in match	1	30
Best bowling	7/70	10/18
Catches/stumpings	14/–	450/–
- Source: CricInfo, 2 March 2020

George Geary (9 July 1893 – 6 March 1981) was a first-class cricketer who played for Leicestershire County Cricket Club and the England cricket team. Primarily a bowler, he took 46 wickets in 14 Tests.

== Abilities ==
Above medium pace and right-handed, Geary was able to swing the new ball and had the ability to bowl with slight yet well-disguised variations of pace and cut. In the last Test of the 1928/1929 Ashes tour he bowled a then test record 81 overs in a single innings. His tall and solid build enabled him to get bounce and bowl longer spells, which was advantageous in Australian conditions, where many English bowlers of slighter build struggled.

Geary was also a capable lower order batsman. His best run scoring season was 923 in 1929. Geary was also an excellent slip fielder.

== Early career ==
Born in Barwell, he was the eldest of sixteen children and was playing cricket for Barwell's 2nd team by the age of 13.

He played a few times for Leicestershire in 1912, but in 1913 established himself as the leading bowler of what became a weakened bowling side owing to the tragic illness of Tom Jayes. The last year before the First World War saw Geary take 114 wickets for just over 20 runs apiece.

During the First World War his leg was injured by a propeller. After a less successful season in 1919 in which his wickets cost over 34 runs each, Geary did not play a single first-class game in 1920. He played a few times in midweek games in 1921, and took 23 wickets and decided to commit himself to Leicestershire again. In 1923 he took 115 wickets for less than eighteen runs apiece, and in 1924, Geary also scored 864 runs for an average of 24. His test debut against South Africa was due only to England experimenting after the test series had already been decided. Geary received a benefit from Leicestershire but it was severely affected by rain.

== Test career ==
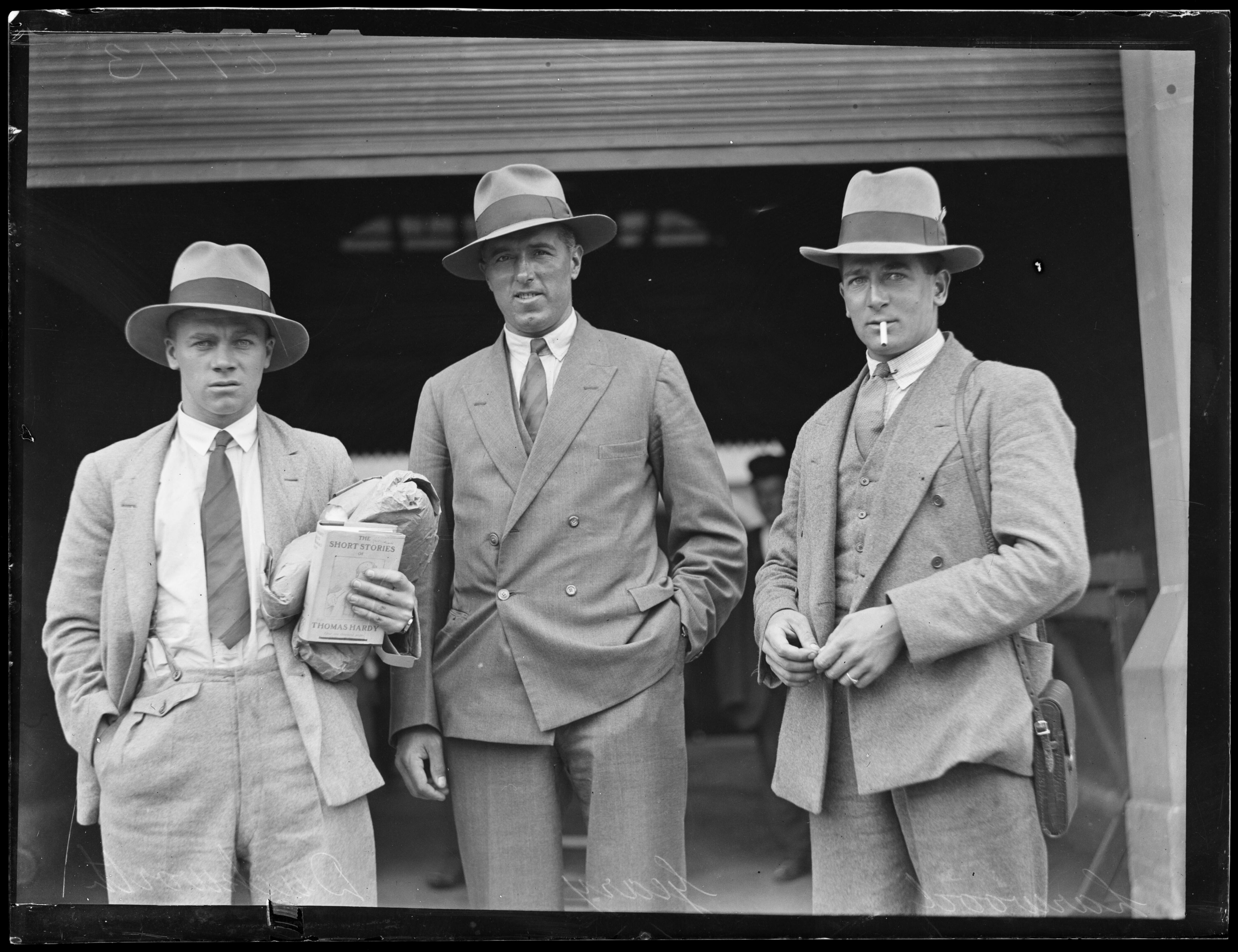
Geary (centre) with George Duckworth and Harold Larwood in Australia in February 1929

In 1925 he scored a maiden century against Kent, and in June 1926 Geary took fourteen wickets against both Hampshire and Lancashire. The latter match was Lancashire's last defeat for over a year and a half. He consequently played in two of the Tests that year and helped save England from defeat at Headingley with some steady batting whilst George Macaulay hit 76, but took only three wickets. In South Africa he bowled well and was said to be regarded as the most dangerous bowler since the incomparable Sydney Barnes, taking twelve wickets at Johannesburg.

However, an arm injury ruled Geary out of the last three Tests and, though he batted with some success in 1928, he could bowl so little that he took only ten wickets. Yet, his bowling style was seen as important for the rock-hard Australian pitches and Geary was still chosen for the tour. He proved a success, and headed the averages. Following on from this, 1929 was his best season, as he exceeded 150 wickets and on a rain-affected pitch against Glamorgan he took figures of 10 wickets for 18 runs, which was at the time the best bowling figures in the history of first-class cricket. He also had his highest ever run scoring season with 923 runs. 1930, with the Australians back, saw Geary as powerless as all of England's other bowlers to stop the onslaught of Bradman, and he was also affected by injury. The form of Voce and Bowes prevented him from retaining his Test place in the following years. Geary still bowled well in 1931 and 1932, but 1933 was less successful as Geary took only 40 wickets.

However, in 1934 his form improved and he was chosen for two Tests, but his only significant contribution was an innings of 53 against the leg spin bowling of Grimmett and O'Reilly at Trent Bridge. These were his last Tests.

== Late career ==
In 1935 Geary was in good form early in the season and took 11 for 40 in one match against Sussex. In his second benefit match the following year, Geary took 7 for 7 and 13 for 43 in the match. His last two seasons in 1937 and 1938 saw him decline with the ball on improved Leicester pitches, but his batting improved and in 1938 he averaged over 30 – far above any previous season – and hit three centuries.

== Retirement and death ==
His retirement at the end of that year did not mark the close of Geary's involvement with cricket. For over twenty years after that he was cricket coach at Charterhouse. Most notably, the batsman Peter May admitted that Geary's coaching played a vital role in his development. After he left Charterhouse in 1959, Geary went to Rugby School, who wanted assistance to develop young players and improve their fortunes. Geary continued to bowl in the nets until he was about seventy-seven. He died after gradually failing health in 1981 at the age of eighty-seven.

Preceded by Pat Morfee	Nelson Cricket Club; Professional; 1920–1921	Succeeded by Ted McDonald
