= Ashby Road =

English cricket ground

Coordinates: 52°33′22.39″N 1°22′02.15″W

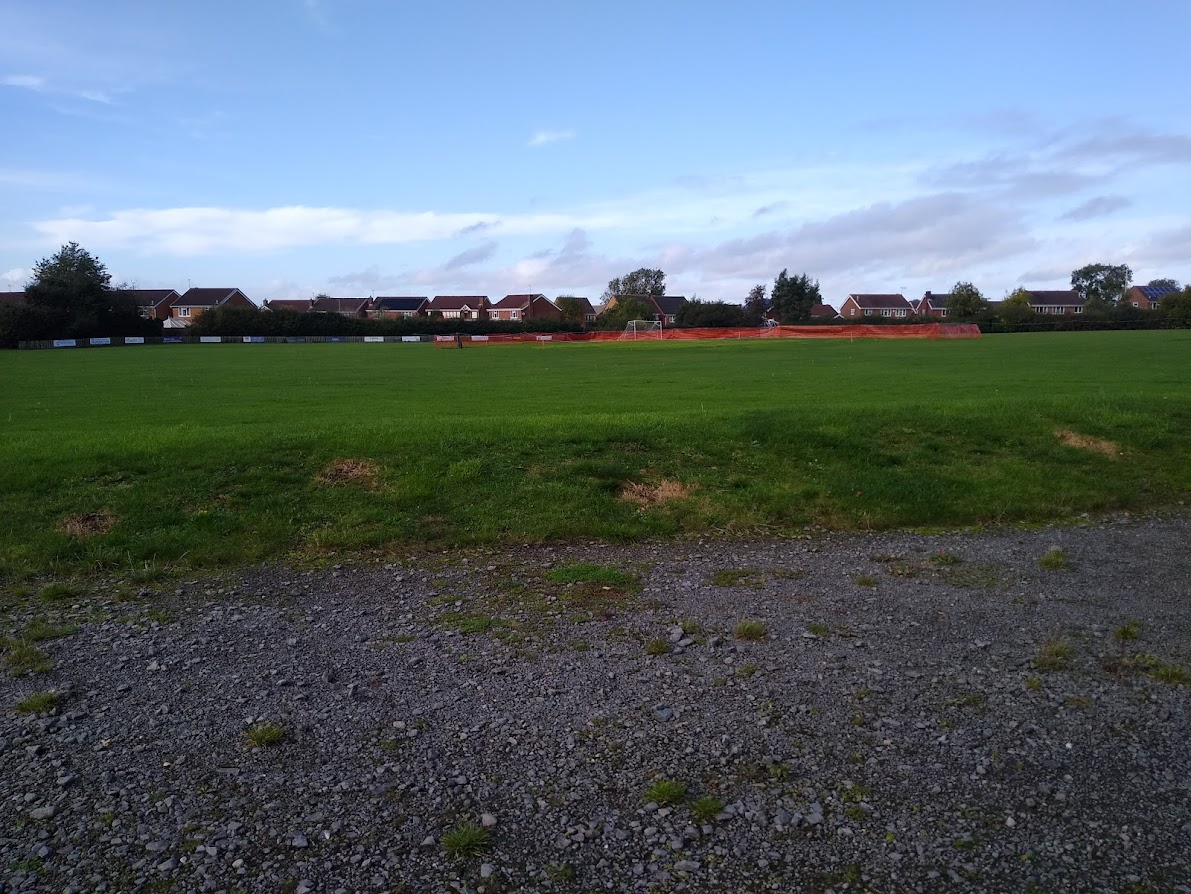

Ground information
- Location: Hinckley, Leicestershire
- Capacity: 4,000

Team information
Leicestershire	(1911–1937)
- As of 29 October 2023; Source: Ground profile

The Ashby Road ground is a cricket ground in the town of Hinckley, Leicestershire, England. It operated as a first-class venue between 1911 and 1937.

Ashby Road has been used by Leicestershire as an out-ground, and held 19 games. The first game took place in 1911 against Warwickshire and the last in 1937 against Worcestershire.
