= Jack Walsh (cricketer) =

Personal information
- Full name: John Edward Walsh
- Born: 4 December 1912; Walcha, New South Wales
- Died: 20 May 1980 (aged 67); Wallsend, New South Wales
- Batting: Left-handed
- Bowling: Slow left-arm wrist-spin

Career statistics
Competition	First-class
Matches	296
Runs scored	7,247
Batting average	17.76
100s/50s	2/21
Top score	106
Balls bowled	54,798
Wickets	1190
Bowling average	24.55
5 wickets in innings	98
10 wickets in match	26
Best bowling	9/101
Catches/stumpings	207/–
- Source: Cricinfo, 17 September 2013

John Edward Walsh (4 December 1912 – 20 May 1980) was an Australian cricketer who played nearly all of his cricket in England.

== Career ==
=== Amateur with Julian Cahn ===
Walsh was brought out of Australian club cricket in 1936 to play as an amateur member of the side taken by the Nottinghamshire cricket impresario Sir Julien Cahn to tour Sri Lanka. Cahn's sides played some first-class matches on this and other tours and in English seasons across the 1930s and over the next three years, Walsh took more than 600 wickets for Cahn's sides, touring New Zealand in 1938–39 and playing three seasons in England. His most notable feat in his few prewar first-class matches was to take nine wickets for 101 in an innings against Glamorgan at Newport, a feat made more significant because Austin Matthews was absent ill. He also played a few matches for Leicestershire between 1937 and 1939. Leicestershire's extreme weakness in spin meant his absence for business reasons was consistently regretted.

When war broke out, Walsh returned to Australia for the 1939–40 season, playing with Petersham in Sydney and two matches for New South Wales without much success. These would be his only first-class matches in Australia. Walsh then would serve for the remainder of World War II with the R.A.A.F. in the Pacific.

=== Postwar professional ===
In 1946, with Cahn having died, Walsh returned to England and became for the next eleven seasons a professional with Leicestershire. He immediately became the county's principal wicket-taker and enlivened many innings with a robust approach to batting. Walsh took over 100 wickets in seven of the first eight postwar seasons, failing only in 1951 when he missed almost half the season through illness ("internal trouble") after a bad start. Besides being the leading first-class wicket-taker in 1948 with 174, his total of 170 wickets is still the Leicestershire county record for a single season.

Recovering from his illness in 1952, Walsh not only took 122 wickets but scored 1106 runs, to complete the all-rounder's double. His all-round skill helped Leicestershire to sixth position, which was their best since 1935 and third-best ever at the time. However, after 1952 his output of overs declined sharply as bowlers like Walsh who were liable to give many runs away became more and more disfavoured. He was omitted from eight matches in 1955 — in which season he had an engagement coaching Oxford University — and bowled only a third as many overs as he had delivered in 1952, then in 1956 he played only three games for the first eleven. Walsh was never recalled after June despite the first eleven falling from sixth to bottom and taking 29 wickets for ten each with the Second Eleven in the Minor Counties Championship.

=== After first-class cricket ===
Walsh retired after the 1956 season, but would play for the Second Eleven until 1958, in which season he captained that team, though as in the first eleven the amount of bowling he did declined rapidly with time. For 1959 he returned to Australia to coach Tasmania. Walsh would later coach Scotland, and Karachi where he would remain up to 1979, one year before he died at the age of sixty-eight back in New South Wales.

== Player profile ==
Walsh bowled left-handed wrist spin, with two googlies:

one, which could easily be detected, to lull the batsman into a sense of security, when he would unleash the other, which was calculated to deceive even the greatest batsmen.

He was a dangerous enough lower-order batsman to score two centuries, although it was generally thought that inability to restrain his desire for straight drives into the pavilion cost him many runs.
