= Leicestershire County Cricket Club =

English cricket club

- One Day name: Leicestershire Foxes

Personnel
- Captain: Ian Holland; Stephen Eskinazi (LA); Ben Green (T20)
- Coach: Alfonso Thomas
- Overseas player(s): Ruan de Swardt; Peter Handscomb
- Chief executive: Emma White

Team information
- Founded: 1879; 147 years ago
- Home ground: Grace Road, Leicester
- Capacity: 6,000 cricket matches / 19,999 concerts

History
- First-class debut: MCC in 1895 at Lord's
- Championship wins: 3
- Pro40 wins: 2
- FP Trophy wins: 0
- One-Day Cup wins: 1
- Twenty20 Cup wins: 3
- Benson & Hedges Cup wins: 3
- Official website: LeicestershireCCC
First-class
One-day
T20

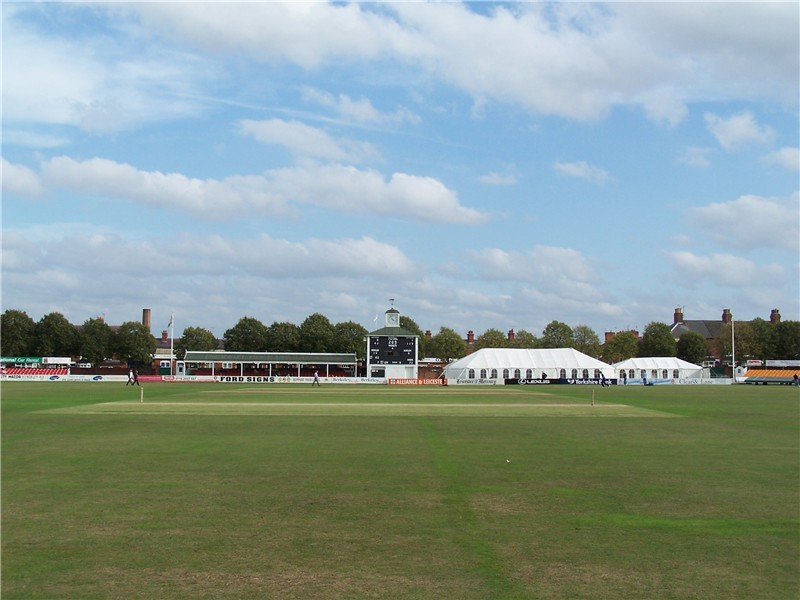
Grace Road cricket ground, Leicester

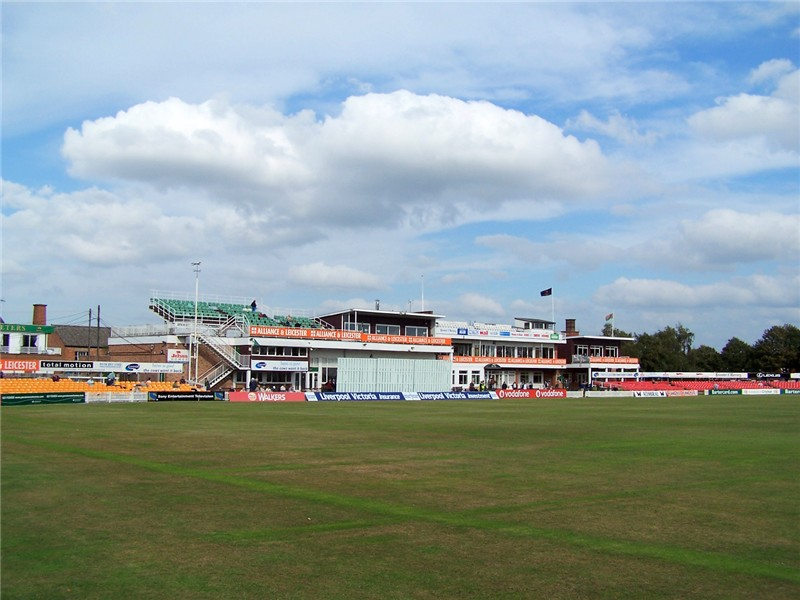
The Pavilion End

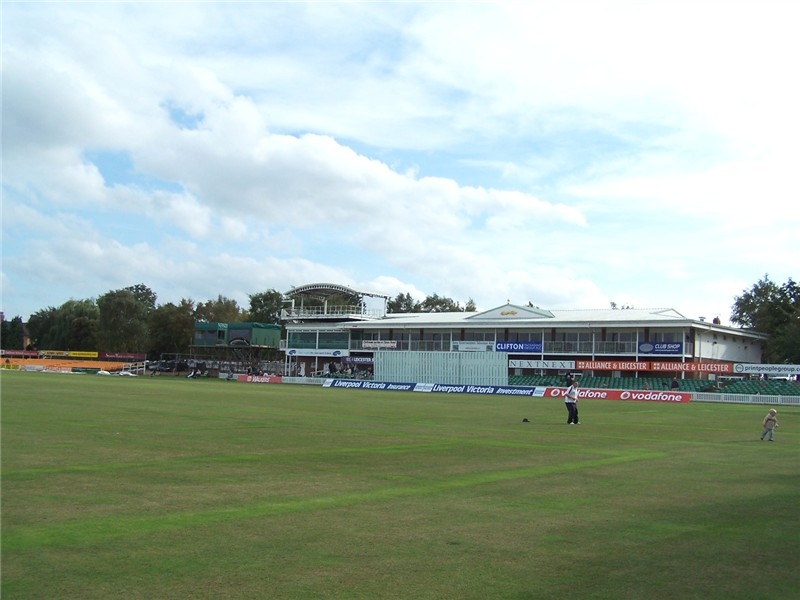
The Bennett End

Leicestershire County Cricket Club is one of eighteen first-class county clubs within the domestic cricket structure of England and Wales. It represents the historic county of Leicestershire. It has also been representative of the county of Rutland. The club's limited overs team is called the Leicestershire Foxes. Founded in 1879, the club had minor county status until 1894, when it was promoted to first-class status pending its entry into the County Championship in 1895. Since then, Leicestershire have played in every top-level domestic cricket competition in England.

The club is based at Grace Road in Leicester, known as The Uptonsteel County Ground for sponsorship reasons, and has also played home games at Aylestone Road in Leicester, at Hinckley, Loughborough, Melton Mowbray, Ashby-de-la-Zouch, Coalville and most recently Kibworth inside the traditional county boundaries of Leicestershire, and at Oakham, in Rutland.

In limited overs cricket, the kit colours are red shirt with green trousers in the One Day Cup and green shirt and green trousers in the T20 Blast. The shirt sponsors in the 2024 season were UptonSteel.

Leicestershire are in the first division of the County Championship and in the north group of the T20 Blast. Recent best performances in one day cricket include winning the T20 Cup three times in eight years between 2004 and 2011, and the One Day Cup in 2023. In first class cricket, Leicestershire won the 2025 second division title in the County Championship.

== Honours ==
=== First XI honours ===
- County Championship (3) – 1975, 1996, 1998

Runners-up (2) – 1982, 1994

- Sunday/National League (2) – 1974, 1977

Runners-up: 1972, 2001

- Midlands Counties Knockout Cup

Runners-up: 1962

- Gillette Cup/NatWest/C&G Trophy/Friends Provident Trophy

Runners-up: 1992, 2001

- Twenty20 Cup/Friends Life t20 (3) – 2004, 2006, 2011
- One-Day Cup (1) – 2023
- Benson & Hedges Cup (3) – 1972, 1975, 1985

Runners-up: 1974, 1998

=== Second XI honours ===
- Second XI Championship (2) – 1983, 2014

Runners-up: 1961, 1975

- Second XI Trophy (5) – 1993, 1995, 1996, 2000, 2014
- Second XI Twenty20 Cup (1) – 2014
- Minor Counties Championship (1) – 1931
- Under-25 Competition(2) – 1975, 1985

+ 1 Bain Hogg Trophy – second XI one-day competition – 1996

== History ==
=== Earliest cricket ===
Cricket may not have reached Leicestershire until well into the 18th century. A notice in the Leicester Journal dated 17 August 1776 is the earliest known mention of cricket in the county. Soon afterwards, a Leicestershire and Rutland Cricket Club was taking part in important matches, mainly against Nottingham Cricket Club and Marylebone Cricket Club (MCC). This club was prominent from 1781 until the beginning of the 19th century.

=== 19th century ===
Little more is heard of Leicestershire cricket until the formation of the present club on 25 March 1879.

Essex CCC versus Leicestershire CCC at Leyton on 14, 15 & 16 May 1894 was the first first-class match for both clubs. In 1895, the County Championship was restructured into a 14-team competition with the introduction of Essex, Leicestershire and Warwickshire CCC.

=== Early and mid-20th century ===
Leicestershire's first 70 years were largely spent in lower table mediocrity, with few notable exceptions. In 1953, the motivation of secretary-captain Charles Palmer lifted the side fleetingly to third place, but most of the rest of the 1950s was spent propping up the table, or thereabouts.

=== Start of improvement: The late 1950s and the 1960s ===
Change came in the late 1950s with the recruitment of Willie Watson at the end of his career with England and Yorkshire. Watson's run gathering sparked the home-grown Maurice Hallam into becoming one of England's best opening batsmen. In bowling, Leicestershire had an erratically successful group of seamers in Terry Spencer, Brian Boshier, John Cotton and Jack van Geloven, plus the spin of John Savage.

Another change was in the captaincy: Tony Lock, the former England and Surrey spinner who had galvanised Western Australia.

=== The 1970s and the first golden era ===
Ray Illingworth, again from Yorkshire, instilled self-belief to the extent that the county took its first ever trophy in 1972, the Benson & Hedges Cup with Chris Balderstone man of the match. This was start of the first golden era as the first of five trophies in five years and included Leicestershire's first ever County Championship title in 1975. A couple of runners up spots were also thrown in.

The game when Leicestershire won their first ever County Championship, on 15 September 1975, marked something of a personal triumph for Chris Balderstone. Batting on 51 not out against Derbyshire at Chesterfield, after close of play he changed into his football kit to play for Doncaster Rovers in an evening match 30 miles away (a 1–1 draw with Brentford). Thus he is the only player to have played League Football and first-class cricket on the same day. He then returned to Chesterfield to complete a century the following morning and take three wickets to wrap up the title. To add to that season's success for Leicestershire was a second Benson & Hedges victory.

=== The 1980s ===
A runners-up spot in the 1982 County Championship brought some respectability, but the decade's only silverware was in the 1985 Benson & Hedges Cup with Balderstone still on board making him the most successful trophy winner in the club's history with six.

=== Success in the late 1990s ===
Leicestershire won the county championship in 1996, and again in 1998, despite their minimal resources compared to other county teams. This Leicestershire side, led by Jack Birkenshaw and James Whitaker, used team spirit and togetherness to get the best out of a group of players who were either discarded from other counties or brought through the Leicestershire ranks.

This team did not have many stars, but Aftab Habib, Darren Maddy, Vince Wells, Jimmy Ormond, Alan Mullally and Chris Lewis all had chances for England. West Indian all-rounder Phil Simmons was also named as one of Wisden's Cricketers of the year in 1997 while playing for the club.

=== 2000 and beyond: Twenty20 success and four-day struggles ===
The advent of Twenty20 cricket saw Leicestershire find a new source of success, winning the domestic T20 competition in 2004, 2006 and 2011. However, in the era of two-division County Championship cricket during the 2000s, they were perennially unsuccessful. Leicestershire spent 22 consecutive years in the second division between 2004 and 2025, winning regular "wooden spoons"; and in 2013 and 2014 they finished without a single Championship win, the first team to achieve this unwanted feat in back to back seasons since Northamptonshire just before World War II. In 2023 they won their first trophy for 12 years, beating Hampshire at Trent Bridge to win the One Day Cup. In 2025, Leicestershire won Division Two for the first time, finally gaining promotion back into the top tier of the competition for 2026.

== Grounds ==
=== Current ===
- Grace Road, Leicester (1877 – present)
- Oakham School, Oakham (2000 – present)
- Kibworth CC (2023–present)

=== Previous ===
- Bath Grounds, Ashby-de-la-Zouch (1912–1964)
- Kirkby Road, Barwell (1946–1947)
- Fox and Goose Ground, Coalville (1913–1914)
- Town Ground, Coalville (1950)
- Snibston Colliery Ground, Coalville (1957–1982)
- Ashby Road, Hinckley (1911–1937)
- Coventry Road, Hinckley (1951–1964)
- Leicester Road, Hinckley (1981–1991)
- Aylestone Road, Leicester (1901–1962)
- Brush Ground, Loughborough (1953–1965)
- College Ground, Loughborough (1928–1929)
- Park Road, Loughborough (1913–1970)
- Egerton Park, Melton Mowbray (1946–1948)

== Players ==
=== Current squad ===
- No. denotes the player's squad number, as worn on the back of their shirt.
- ‡ denotes players with international caps.
- * denotes a player who has been awarded a county cap.

No.	Name	Nationality	Birth date	Batting style	Bowling style	Notes
Batters
2	Sheridon Gumbs	England	25 May 2004 (age 22)	Left-handed	Right-arm leg break	
11	Sol Budinger	England	21 August 1999 (age 27)	Left-handed	Right-arm off break	
15	Hamza Shaikh	England	29 May 2006 (age 20)	Right-handed	Right-arm leg break	
28	Stephen Eskinazi	England	28 March 1994 (age 32)	Right-handed	—	Captain (LA)
54	Peter Handscomb* ‡	Australia	26 April 1991 (age 35)	Right-handed	—	Overseas player
All-rounders
6	Ben Green	England	28 September 1997 (age 29)	Right-handed	Right-arm medium	Captain (T20)
22	Ian Holland* ‡	United States	3 October 1990 (age 36)	Right-handed	Right-arm fast-medium	Club captain; UK Passport
48	Ruan de Swardt ‡	South Africa	21 January 1998 (age 28)	Left-handed	Right-arm fast-medium	Overseas player
53	Rehan Ahmed* ‡	England	13 August 2004 (age 22)	Right-handed	Right-arm leg break	England central contract
Wicket-keepers
12	Jonny Tattersall	England	15 December 1994 (age 31)	Right-handed	Right-arm leg break	
—	Josh Blake	England	18 September 1998 (age 28)	Right-handed	Right-arm leg break	
Bowlers
20	Josh Hull ‡	England	20 August 2004 (age 22)	Left-handed	Left-arm fast-medium	England development contract
38	Josh Davey ‡	Scotland	3 August 1990 (age 36)	Right-handed	Right-arm fast-medium	
43	Alex Green	England	24 February 2007 (age 19)	Right-handed	Right-arm fast-medium	
44	Theo Marshall	England	12 August 2007 (age 19)	Right-handed	Right-arm fast-medium	
88	Tom Scriven	England	18 November 1998 (age 27)	Right-handed	Right-arm fast-medium	
—	Ali Farooq	England	12 March 2007 (age 19)	Right-handed	Slow left-arm orthodox	
—	Raheem Ahmed	England	26 May 2003 (age 23)	Left-handed	Left-arm fast-medium	
Source: Updated: 29 September 2026

== International players ==
England

- (England) Jonathan Agnew
- (England) Ewart Astill
- (England) Chris Balderstone
- (England) Jack Birkenshaw
- (England) Nigel Briers
- (England) Stuart Broad
- (England) Michael Carberry
- (England) Nick Cook
- (England) Eddie Dawson
- (England) Phillip DeFreitas
- (England) George Geary
- (England) David Gower
- (England) Aftab Habib
- (England) Matthew Hoggard
- (England) Ken Higgs
- (England) Josh Hull
- (England) Ray Illingworth
- (England) John King
- (England) Albert Knight
- (England) Barry Knight
- (England) Chris Lewis
- (England) Tony Lock
- (England) Darren Maddy
- (England) Devon Malcolm
- (England) Alan Mullally
- (England) Tom New
- (England) Paul Nixon
- (England) Jimmy Ormond
- (England) Charles Palmer
- (England) Dick Pougher
- (England) Jeremy Snape
- (England) Peter Such
- (England) James Taylor
- (England) Les Taylor
- (England) Roger Tolchard
- (England) Willie Watson
- (England) Vince Wells
- (England) James Whitaker
- (England) Peter Willey
- (England) Luke Wright

Australia

- (Australia) Michael Bevan
- (Australia) Brad Hodge
- (Australia) Michael Kasprowicz
- (Australia) Andrew McDonald
- (Australia) Garth McKenzie
- (Australia) Mark Cosgrove

Bangladesh

- (Bangladesh) Shakib Al Hasan

India

- (India) Anil Kumble
- (India) Virender Sehwag
- (India) RP Singh
- (India) Javagal Srinath
- (India) Varun Aaron
- (India) Ajinkya Rahane

New Zealand

- (New Zealand) Stewie Dempster

Pakistan

- (Pakistan) Mohammad Asif
- (Pakistan) Shahid Afridi
- (Pakistan) Abdul Razzaq
- (Pakistan) Sohail Khan
- (Pakistan) Mohammad Abbas

South Africa

- (South Africa) HD Ackerman
- (South Africa) Hansie Cronje
- (South Africa) HH Dippenaar
- (South Africa) Claude Henderson
- (South Africa) Charl Langeveldt
- (South Africa) Charl Willoughby

West Indies

- (Antigua and Barbuda) Winston Benjamin
- (Barbados) Vasbert Drakes
- (Barbados) Ottis Gibson
- (Jamaica) Jermaine Lawson
- (Antigua and Barbuda) Andy Roberts
- (Guyana) Ramnaresh Sarwan
- (Trinidad and Tobago) Phil Simmons
- (Jamaica) Jerome Taylor

Zimbabwe

- (Zimbabwe) Neil Johnson

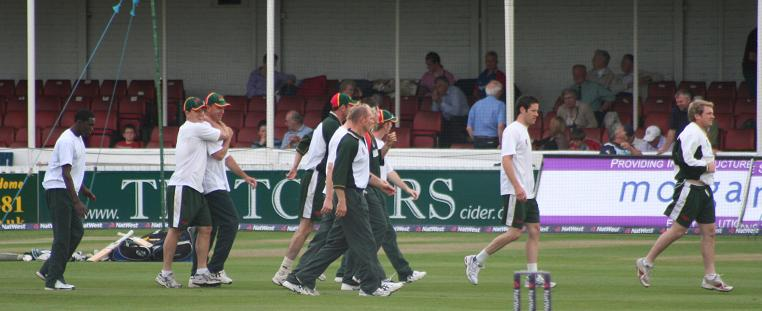
Members of the 2007 squad warming up

== Records ==
Most first-class runs for Leicestershire
Qualification – 17,000 runs

Player	Runs
Les Berry	30,143
Maurice Hallam	23,662
John King	22,618
Cecil Wood	21,872
Ewart Astill	19,879
Norman Armstrong	19,001
Nigel Briers	18,726
Maurice Tompkin	18,590
Brian Davison	18,537
Albert Knight	18,142
Chris Balderstone	17,627
Samuel Coe	17,367

Most first-class wickets for Leicestershire
Qualification – 600 wickets

Player	Wickets
Ewart Astill	2,131
George Geary	1,759
Terry Spencer	1,320
Jack Walsh	1,127
John King	1,100
Haydon Smith	1,076
Vic Jackson	930
Jack Birkenshaw	908
John Savage	816
William Odell	650
Jonathan Agnew	632

Most first-team winners medals for Leicestershire

- J. C. Balderstone – 6

=== Batting ===
- Highest team total: 756-4d v. Sussex, Hove, 2022
- Highest home team total: 638-8d v. Worcestershire, Grace Road, 1996
- Lowest team total: 25 v. Kent, Leicester, 1912
- Highest total against: 761-6d by Essex, Chelmsford, 1990
- Lowest total against: 24 by Glamorgan, Leicester, 1971
- Highest individual score: 309* by HD Ackerman v. Glamorgan, Sophia Gardens, 2006.
- Highest home individual score: 262 by Brad Hodge v. Durham, Grace Road, 2004
- Highest partnership: 477* by C. N. Ackermann and P. W. A. Mulder v. Sussex, Hove, 2022

Best partnership for each wicket (county championship)

- 1st – 390 B. Dudleston and J. F. Steele v. Derbyshire, Leicester, 1979
- 2nd – 320 Hassan Azad and N. J. Dexter v. Gloucestershire, Leicester, 2019
- 3rd – 316* W. Watson and A. Wharton v. Somerset, Taunton, 1961
- 4th – 290* P. Willey and T. J. Boon v. Warwickshire, Leicester, 1984
- 5th – 477* C. N. Ackermann and P. W. A. Mulder v. Sussex, Hove, 2022
- 6th – 284 P. V. Simmons and P. A. Nixon v. Durham, Chester-le-Street, 1996
- 7th – 219* J. D. R. Benson and P. Whitticase v. Hampshire, Bournemouth, 1991
- 8th – 239 L. P. J. Kimber and O. B. Cox v. Sussex, Hove, 2024
- 9th – 160 R. T. Crawford and W. W. Odell v. Worcestershire, Leicester, 1902
- 10th – 228 R. Illingworth and K. Higgs v. Northamptonshire, Leicester, 1977

=== Bowling ===
- Most first-class wickets in a season: 170 by Jack Walsh, 1948
- Best bowling figures in an innings: 10–18 by George Geary v. Glamorgan, Ynysangharad Park, Pontypridd, 1929
- Best bowling figures in a match: 16–96 by George Geary

=== Fielding ===
- Most dismissals in an innings: 7 by Neil Burns v. Somerset, Grace Road, 2001
- Most dismissals in a match: 10 by Percy Corrall v. Sussex, Hove, 1936

== Sub Academy ==
The Leicestershire Sub Academy is designed for young cricketers who have potential to play at the highest level. It is also called the EPP (Emerging Player Programme). Many players who are involved in this set up move on to the LCCC academy, where they will play matches against academies from other counties.
