= Earl Shilton =

Town in Leicestershire, England

Coordinates: 52.57777°N 1.30491°W

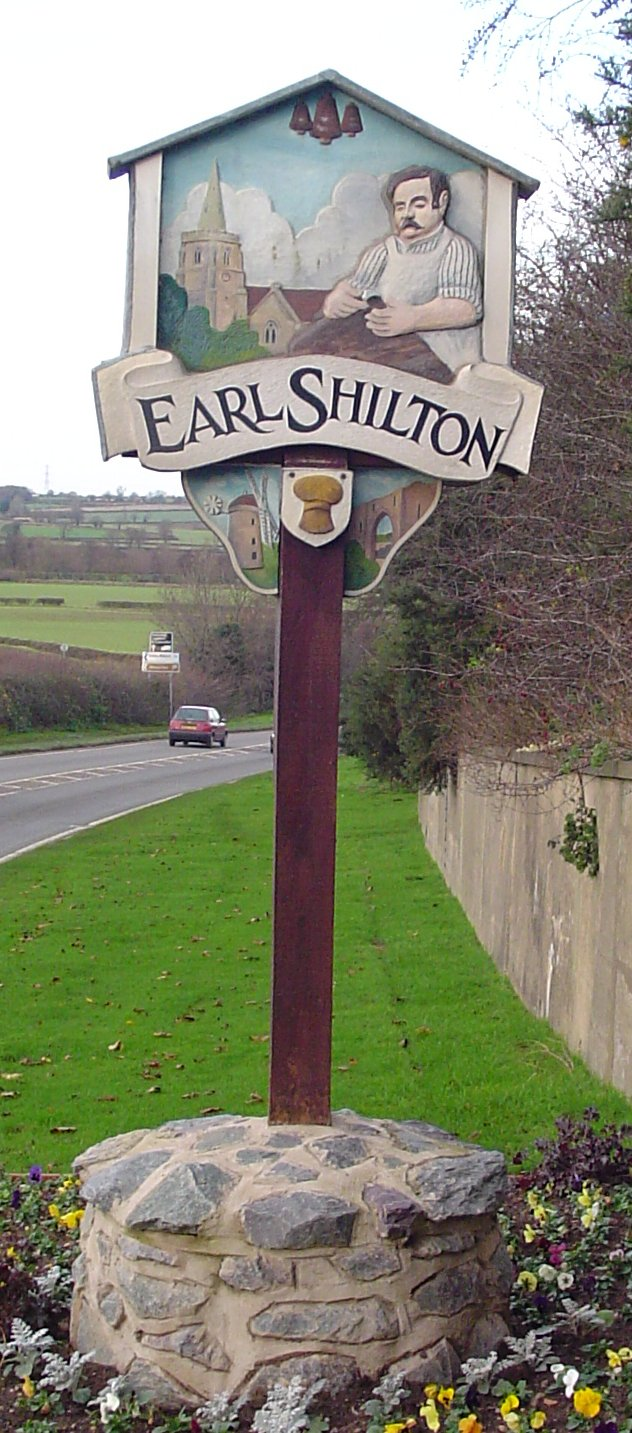
- Town sign

- Location within Leicestershire
- Population: 10,047 (2011 Census)
- OS grid reference: SP472980
- District: Hinckley and Bosworth
- Shire county: Leicestershire
- Region: East Midlands
- Country: England
- Sovereign state: United Kingdom
- Post town: Leicester
- Postcode district: LE9
- Dialling code: 01455
- Police: Leicestershire
- Fire: Leicestershire
- Ambulance: East Midlands
- UK Parliament: Hinckley and Bosworth
- Website: Welcome to Earl Shilton

Earl Shilton (/ˈɜːrl ˌʃɪltən/ or locally [ɪw ʃɪwʔn̩] 'ill Shilton') is a market town in Leicestershire, England, about 5 miles (8 km) from Hinckley and about 10 mi (16 km) from Leicester. The 2011 Census recorded its population as 10,047.

== Toponymy ==
The town's name derives from the Old English for 'farm/settlement on a shelved terrain'. In the Domesday Book (1086) it is recorded as Scheltone. Schulton or Scheltone is an ancient word, which means shelf; Shilton is therefore Scheltone or shelf-town, a derivation supported by the village's standing on the top of a long, narrow ridge in the southwest of the county. .

== History ==
=== Pre-Norman period ===
==== Pre-history ====
The village of Earl Shilton would evolve on Shilton Hill in what would be south Leicestershire. Below the hill ran an ancient trackway known as the Salt Road, connecting east and west Leicestershire. A tribe known as the Corieltauvi constructed this road, running along the southern edge of the Great Leicester Forest, a vast tract of woodland which entirely covered west Leicestershire and stretched up into Nottinghamshire and Derbyshire. The Salt Road was a major artery of trade and passage for many centuries to come.

The Corieltauvi tribe had moved to Britain from continental Europe some time after 100 BC. They were a confederation of Belgic warriors who carved out a kingdom which stretched from the Humber to south Leicestershire. These ancient Britons were not really a unified tribe, but a collection of peoples sharing the same way of life. The tribe generally did not rely on hill forts for their protection. It appears that the Corieltauvi were better farmers than warriors, for they lived in lowland settlements, usually beside streams, frequently surrounded, or even hidden, by areas of thick forest.

==== Roman period ====
The Roman army arrived in Britain in 43 AD, and quickly set about its conquest. Roman Legions spread north and west and by AD 47 were advancing into Leicestershire. At this time, Corieltauvi tribal chiefs were being severely harassed by their neighbours, the Brigantes, and so welcomed the Romans as a source of protection and stability. Ostorius Scapula, the Roman Governor in Britain, established the frontier zone delineated by the Fosse Way through the middle of friendly Corieltauvi territory.

Earl Shilton’s first industry arrived during this period, as a pottery was established on Shilton Heath, (behind the modern day Heathfield High School). There was an excellent vein of clay found in the vicinity of Earl Shilton’s Roman kiln. Early in the second century it started producing low grade, grey ware pots, used for everyday cookery and storage (John Lawrence). Locally there was another pottery at Desford, and Stoney Stanton lived up to its name by the opening of a Roman quarry.

==== Saxon and Danish periods ====
Earl Shilton lay in the kingdom of the Middle Angles. Middle Anglia and Mercia were built around the River Trent and the rivers that flow into it, such as the Soar.

The first recorded attacks on Saxon England by Viking raiders came at the end of the eighth century. Being well inland, early Viking raids did not affect the villagers of Earl Shilton but in 874—875 a great heathen army of Danes moved up the River Trent and into the heart of Mercia. They attacked and overran Nottingham before moving their ships along the River Trent into north Leicestershire.

Domesday records show that Shultone had 5 ploughlands worth 5 shillings at the time of Edward the Confessor. Shultone’s neighbour, the village of Barwell, stood on the lands of Leofric, Earl of Mercia (John Lawrence).

=== Early Medieval Earl Shilton ===
==== Grandmesnil ====
Following the Norman Conquest William the Conqueror besieged and captured the city of Leicester in 1068, about two years after the Battle of Hastings. William handed the government of Leicester over to Hugh de Grandmesnil, one of the Norman adventurers. He also gave de Grandmesnil 100 manors for his services, 65 of them in Leicestershire, including Earl Shilton. He was appointed sheriff of the county of Leicester. He married Adeliza, daughter of Ivo, Count of Beaumont-sur-l'Oise. Hugh de Grandmesnil and his wife, who died in 1087, had five sons and as many daughters together.

==== Domesday Survey, 1086 ====
Earl Shilton, like many English villages, first appears in recorded history in the Domesday Book of 1086, the first complete tax record for the whole of England. One of the parcels of land granted to Hugh de Grandmesnil by William the Conqueror was the village of Scheltone, now known as Earl Shilton. The village measured some 500 acres (2.0 km^{2}). The village boasted 3 ploughs, with 1 serf and 4 sokemen. Sokemen were the highest class of free peasants, a lower aristocracy, and were thought to be the descendants of the Danes who settled in the East Midlands. The village also had a priest, 10 villeins and 5 bordars. Villeins and bordars were below sokemen and tied to the land. Villeins often held between 30 and 100 acres (120,000 and 400,000 m^{2}), while bordars were of a lower standing and usually had a smallholding. Attached to the village of Sheltone were 12 acres (49,000 m^{2}) of meadow and a mill of 16 pence (£0.07) value, with woodland 8 furlongs (1,600 m) in length and 3 broad valued at 70 shillings (£3.50). Following the Norman Conquest there must have been some inflation as during the time of Edward the Confessor Sheltone's woodland was valued at 5 shillings (£0.25). The population of the village would have been 75 to 80 people.

The fields of Earl Shilton manor were open spaces divided into long narrow strips. Only the fields being grazed by cattle were fenced. The others were open and were identifiable as separate fields only by the crops which they bore. The unusual detail was that the single crop in each field was separately farmed - in individual strips - by peasant families of the local village.

Some of the strips which belonged to the local lord, were farmed for him by the peasants under their feudal obligations. Strip-farming was central to the life of a medieval rural community. It involved an intrinsic element of fairness, for each peasant's strips were widely spread over the entire manor; every family would have the benefit of good land in some areas, while accepting a poor yield elsewhere. The strips also enforced an element of practical village democracy. The system only worked if everyone sowed the same crop on their strip of each open field. What to sow and when to harvest it were communal decisions. The field could not be fenced, or the cattle let into it, until each peasant had reaped his own harvest. When the harvest was in the peasant would compulsorily pay their lord to grind the corn in his mill.

Ploughing too was a communal affair. The heavy wheeled plough needed for northern soils was expensive, as were horses or oxen to pull it, so a team of horses and a plough worked successive strips of an open field for different peasants. The long narrow shape of the strips reflected the difficulty of turning the team at each end. In addition to the open fields, each village or manor had common land where peasants had the right to graze cattle, collect wood, cut turf and at times catch fish.

==== Robert de Beaumont ====
Ivo de Grandmesnil died on a crusade to Jerusalem, and when he did not return Robert Beaumont broke his oaths and took control of the whole of Leicester. He dispossessed Ivo’s children and added all the Grandmesnil estates to his own. By sleight of hand, Earl Shilton manor was now held by Robert Beaumont, who was created the first Earl of Leicester by the king.

Beaumont died in 1118, and his son, another Robert, known as Bossu, became the 2nd Earl of Leicester. Although Robert Bossu held lands throughout the country, in the 1120s he began to rationalise his estates in Leicestershire. The estates of the See of Lincoln and the Earl of Chester were seized by force. This gave Bossu a compact block of estates which were bounded by Nuneaton, Loughborough, Melton Mowbray and Market Harborough.

=== Later Medieval Earl Shilton ===
==== Earl Shilton Castle ====
Robert Bossu was a close adviser to King Stephen of England. As such Bossu fortified his lands to protect his interests against the partisans of the Empress Matilda. During the civil war of 1135-53, it is likely that Robert Bossu began the fortification of Shilton Hill. The Earl of Leicester’s new motte and bailey castle would protect the vale of Kirkby, along with Beaumont’s lines of communication to the South and West. Earl Shilton's castle was built around the site of an existing twelfth-century chapel called Saint Peter's that lies between Church Street and Almey’s Lane. This area is known locally as 'Hall Yard'. Nearby are the springs, from which the castle drew its water, now known as Spring Gardens.

The castle, as a fortress, lasted for 30 to 40 years before its destruction, and subsequent conversion to a hunting lodge. There are no records of a siege or fighting in the area of Earl Shilton, even during the civil war, which probably shows that the castle was doing its job (John Lawrence). When the parish church was rebuilt in 1854, the stone from the castle was used for its construction.

In 1173 Prince Henry started a rebellion against his father King Henry II. Robert de Beaumont, 3rd Earl of Leicester was in France when the rebellion began and joined the Prince’s faction, fighting several battles. While still on the road, on 17 October at Fornham, outside Bury St Edmunds, the king’s supporters attacked. The Earls of Norfolk and Leicester were surprised and defeated. Beaumont was captured and imprisoned at Falaise in Normandy. The king set about destroying all but two of the rebel Earl's castles, including Earl Shilton. However, Earl Shilton manor would remain, being a good source of revenue.

==== Shilton Park ====
Shilton Park was probably created by Simon de Montfort, after he became Earl of Leicester. De Montfort’s association with the village was such that the prefix 'Earl' was added to its name.

The original purpose of Shilton Park was to provide a hunting ground, stocked with game, for the lord of the manors' sport and food. The park was surrounded by a deep ditch, to keep the animals in, and beyond that, a high fence to keep the general population out. The Earl of Leicester’s park of Tooley sat below Shilton Hill, stretching into the northwest towards Desford, enclosing 450 acres (1.8 km^{2}).

The upkeep of the park lay in the hands of the Earl's bailiff, or 'Keeper of the park', a responsible occupation, as the park generated substantial revenue to help offset its huge running costs. It supplied a rich source of timber, horses were raised, and the park provided a continual supply of fresh meat, while fees were levied on anyone wishing to graze their animals on parklands. The bailiff could graze his own animals in the park freely, at the Earl’s discretion.

==== Edmund Crouchback and after ====
King Henry III briefly held Shilton manor and park following the death of Simon de Montfort, before giving it to his son Edmund 'Crouchback'. Created Earl of Leicester and Lancaster, Edmund 'Crouchback' took possession of Earl Shilton in 1272, for a security of 3,000 gold marks, and the parish was held of Lancaster from this time (John Lawrence).

The Earl appointed Richard de Schulton, the elder, to manage the running of the estate in Earl Shilton. He also collected the Earl's dues for the Earls of Lancaster for roughly the next thirty years.

The Manor of Sheltone 1297 The main house with gardens and all its issues are worth three shillings. There are 240 acres (1.0 km^{2}) worth yearly £7 at 6d per acre. There are in villainage 34 bovates of land for which the villains render 10/- 5d. There are 8 acres (32,000 m^{2}) of land in villeinage which render 49s 8d. The natives hold 27 acres 1 rood which render 27s 41/2d. Free tenants render 27s 7½ d. The cottars render 80 hens worth 6s 8d. There is a windmill and a watermill worth 53s 4d, a pasture worth 40shillings. The grazing is worth 10s. The Park of Tolowe (Tooley) is not extended because the bailiff has all his animals there.

A knight, Richard de Schulton, held the land from Edmund, Earl of Lancaster, and saw to the daily business of the estate. Richard is the earliest landowner known to have lived and worked in Earl Shilton. His recorded history began when he attended King Edward I's Easter court at Leicester in 1283. De Schulton and his wife, Constance, became lord and lady of the manor, and had at least two sons, Richard, the younger, and John. The family were minor Leicestershire gentry who are known to have held other lands in Thurleston, Mershton, Normanton juxta Thurleston, Weston juxta Blaby, Normanton Turville, Countesthorp and Bitmeswelle.

Thomas of Lancaster became the new overlord of Shilton Manor in 1298, on the death of his father Edmund 'Crouchback'. Earl Shilton manor at this time had 240 acres (1.0 km^{2}) worth yearly £7.

Richard de Schulton, the elder, died in 1314. His wife remarried, and William de Nevil moved into the manor with her. This took up much court time, as the family squabbled over their inheritance with the younger Richard de Shulton.

William de Nevil was also in court for various crimes and thefts of his property. In 1321 three men from Shilton, Ricard Blodewe, John Annys and John, son of Rodger, were all charged with taking Will de Nevils' boar, worth 20 shillings and hunting it maliciously with dogs.

In 1324 Henry, who had succeeded his brother to the title of Leicester and Lancaster, met with John Norton, Mayor of Leicester and his burgesses at Shulton Manor. The great Earl's arrival at Earl Shilton must have been a grand occasion, as accommodation and food were made available for a large retinue of barons, knights and servants.

==== Various goings on ====
An armed raid took place in Earl Shilton in 1326. Nicholas de Charnels, at the head of a band of brigands, rode into Earl Shilton intent on plunder (John Lawrence). This party of raiders included three other knights, the parson of Aylmesthorp (Elmesthorpe), along with their servants and retainers. They broke into the manor house yard, taking away goods and chattels worth £300. In the Trinity Court of Edward II, held in Leicester 1326, Nicolas de Carnels, Parson John de Charnels, Walter de Bodicote of Weston, Richard de la Hay of Aylmersthorp and Roger de Claybrook of Leycester, were made to answer for their crime.

The widowed lady of the manor Constance de Shulton died on 20 May 1349, the year the Black Death arrived at Earl Shilton. Her second husband William de Nevil had already died, in 1337. Her son Richard, who must have been in his 50s, took over running the family estates at Earl Shilton. Richard de Shulton also lived for over seventy years, but by 1361 John de Neld held the manor at Shulton on the death of Henry of Grosmont, Duke of Lancaster.

The manor of Earl Shilton was given to John of Gaunt as part of her dowry when he married in 1359 Blanche, younger daughter of Henry of Grosmont, Duke of Lancaster. John of Gaunt would often enjoy the hunting offered by Shilton Park and its Manor, when he was in residence at Leicester Castle.

Robert de Swillington, a knight, was leasing a plot of land in Shilton Park by 1392. This included Priors Wood, 10 acres (40,000 m^{2}) in Kirkby Mallory, and Shilton Wood, another 8 acres (32,000 m^{2}). It was passed onto Roger de Swillington, who on his death, in 1418, left the property to his son John, who died the following year. The woodland was passed to his sister Joan. The De Swillington family’s association with Shilton Park ended with the death of Joan in 1427.

A gang of serial poachers were caught in Shilton Park in 1420. Three men from Thorneton, Yeoman Thomas Harryson, together with Thomas Jakes and William Northowe, both husbandmen, aided by John Oakes of Odeston, were all charged with 'breaking the kings park of Schulton and hunting therein'. William Armeston, representing the king also accused them of the same crime at Desford and Leicester Firth (New Parks). How the court found these poachers is not recorded, but the punishment would probably be administered in a swift and grisly fashion.

During the reign of the Yorkist King Edward IV, the Shilton Park laws were rescinded, probably as it had belonged to the Lancastrian princes, and the land was given over to the Ruding family.

==== Richard III ====
On Friday, 19 August 1485 King Richard III mustered his army in Leicester. He learned from his scouts that the army of Lord Stanley was at Stoke Golding while William Stanley was at Shenton. Henry Tudor and his small army were camped around Atherstone. On the following day, Richard and the royal army left Leicester expecting to meet his rival near Hinckley. Swinging to the southwest, Richard is thought to have used the ancient track way to Shilton Hill and his army spent the night camped around the churches of Elmesthorpe and Shulton. No doubt all the food in the village was requisitioned before the royal army moved on to Sutton Cheyney and Ambion Hill where Richard was defeated and killed.

At the end of the Wars of the Roses Edward Trussel held plots of land in Derby and Earl Shilton and was Overseer of Elmesthorpe manor held from Lord de la Zouche. Elmesthorpe was valued at £34 at this time, while his holdings in Earl Shilton were worth 40 shillings. When Trussel died his children were still young and his lands were held by the king, for his son, John Trussel, was still in his minority. Unfortunately John Trussel did not have very long to enjoy his estates, dying on 20 December 1499. The next heir was John’s sister, Elizabeth, who was born in 1497, and was ten years old when the court granted her inheritance in 1507. Elizabeth Trussel's fate is unknown but shortly after this period Elmesthorpe was depopulated and the church fell into disrepair.

=== Tudor era ===
After the Battle of Bosworth Field, Henry VII reinstated the Park laws for Earl Shilton. Henry Churchman was appointed bailiff for the parks upkeep, and also bow bearer for the park of Leicester Firth (New Parks). George Hastings became the keeper of Earl Shilton and Hinckley Parks in 1507, and by 1560 the keeper was George Vincent.

In the reign of Henry VIII, the Crown gave a piece of the lands in Earl Shilton to Trinity Hospital, Cambridge.

In 1564, there were ten families living in Earl Shilton, less than in 1086.

=== Stuart era ===
In the reign of Charles I the Crown sold Earl Shilton’s farm to the Earl of Ilchester whose rents were later given up to Guy’s Hospital, London which received them for many years.

In 1636, John Wightman gave £50 for the poor of Hinckley and a field in Earl Shilton was also let, earning £3 5s per year. By 1711 Peter Cappur was the steward of the manor in Shilton and John Wightman's legacy was in dispute. At the Court Baron for that year, on 13 October, Francis Thompson, a tenant of Studford Close, Earl Shilton, surrendered a field of 2½ acres to Nathaniel Ward and Thomas Sansome, held in trust for the poor of Hinckley. This charity ran for some time for in 1809, Rob Thompson and Thomas Sansome were the trustees.

By 1664 Earl Shilton had 34 households assessed for hearth tax, and in the reign of James II in 1687 there were 52 houses assessed in the village.

=== Sale of Shilton Park at Tooley ===
In 1608 Tooley contained 3,500 trees worth nearly £1000. Henry Morrison was knighted in 1627 and he and his wife bought Simon de Montfort's hunting park of Tooley. Their daughter Letticia was married to Lucius Cary, 2nd Viscount Falkland and they lived for a time at the Park.

From the start of the English Civil War in 1642 the broad tract of country between Ashby de la Zouch, Leicester and Watling Street became the buffer zone between the rival garrisons of Royalists and the Parliamentarians. One of the first shocks that the war had in store for the civilian population was the sudden increase in the number of new taxes that had to be raised for the support of these new garrisons. Records show that the Parliamentary tax for the combined parishes of Burbage and Sketchley was £2-8 shillings and 4 pence per month.

Following the Civil War the Parliamentarians took revenge on their enemies. Earl Shilton’s Richard Churchman was listed among the gentry who in 1645 were 'compounded' for their estates with the Parliamentary Sequestration Committee, along with Thomas Crofts, another Royalist. This meant that they had to pay a heavy fine to retrieve their estates.

Also the local curate William Holdsworth was accused of being a Royalist or 'malignant'. John Walker, who wrote about the Sufferings of the Clergy during the Grand Rebellion, records that Holdsworth was hauled before the County Committee in 1646 for 'reviling' Parliament (see also the Committee for Plundered Ministers). His offences included ignoring the Directory set by Parliament to enforce puritan reforms, refusing sacraments to those not kneeling, allowing Sunday games and reading a Royalist "Protestation" in the middle of a sermon. He was also accused of being "several times drunk" and using "old notes as new sermons" for the past twenty years.

=== The Baptists ===
There were Baptists in Earl Shilton from 1651. These Dissenters from the established church met in cottages around Church Street and Mill Street as their religion was against the law. In the Restoration the Baptists were still persecuted, and the Shilton dissenters continued to worship in secret. Eventually Baptist worship was licensed by an act of Parliament. King Charles II’s state papers say that licences to Edward Cheyney and William Biges of Earl Shilton were granted.

John Goadby died in 1714, and in his will he bequeathed to the 'minister and poor Baptists in Earl Shilton - my close and its associated lands, commonly called Crowhearst. And to take any rents, fines or profits, for the disposal of the said Baptists.'

Many generations of Cheneys also worked for the Baptists, the last dying in 1815. A Baptist meeting house was built in 1758 and enlarged in 1844. The Sunday school began in 1801.

In 1861 economic disaster struck the village when the American Civil War broke out and cotton could not be exported. The Baptist minister, Reverend Parkinson, was forced to resign through lack of funds. Crowhearst and its land was eventually sold to Mr W H Cotton in 1928 and the money invested in government stock.

Licence of Cottages used for Worship in Earl Shilton

- 1720 Jeremiah Parker
- 1722 Jonathan Johnstone
- 1725 Joshua Brotherton
- 1726 Joseph Smith
- 1731 Samuel Cheney
- 1760 William Randen
- 1790 Daniel Harrold
- 1792 Thomas Green

Not all dissenters were Baptists. William Randen was a Presbyterian.

Earl Shilton still has a Baptist church which celebrated its 360th anniversary with a special service on 22 May 2011.

=== Thomas Boothby of Tooley ===
In 1696, and at 15 years of age, Thomas Boothby inherited the estate of Tooley Park. Married three times, he acquired through his wives various estates in Staffordshire. From his mother, he inherited land at Foston in Derbyshire and Peatling, Countesthorpe and Earl Shilton in Leicestershire.

The ease of his position was such that the young 'Tom O' Tooley' was able to devote himself almost exclusively to the pursuit of hunting. He established the first true pack of foxhounds in the country and the Quorn Hunt with a number of hounds inherited with the Tooley estate. Boothby embarked on an astonishing career of 55 seasons as founding Master of the Quorn Hunt.

Boothby kept a mistress, Catherine Holmes, at Groby Pool House. A local clergyman informed Boothby's wife about her husband's mistress. After his wife had confronted him, Boothby got hold of the minister in question and almost drowned him in Groby Pool.

His eldest son, Thomas Boothby-Skrymsher, was briefly member of parliament for Leicester.

=== Superstition and witchcraft ===
Superstition was rife in 18th-century England, and there are many tales of ghosts, witches and spirits. A woman of Earl Shilton parish declared 'that she had been bewitched by an old woman from Aston in 1776. Her accuser saw the old woman unceremoniously thrown into the horse pond, despite her 80 years of age. Luckily the old woman just managed to escape with her life.'

Extract from Leicester and Nottingham Journal, July 6, 1776:

“A woman of the parish of Earl Shilton, in the County of Leicester, has been subject for some years to a disorder resembling the bite of the tarantula, and so astonishing the ignorance of many, that they imagine that she has been bewitched by an old lady in the neighbouring village of Aston.

On Thursday, June 20th last, the afflicted, her husband and son went to the old woman, and with dreadful imprecations, threatened to destroy her instantly unless she would submit to have blood drawn from some part of her body, and unless she would give the woman a blessing and remove her disorder. The son, who is a soldier, drew his sword and pointing to her breast, swore he would plunge it into her heart if she did not immediately comply.

When the old woman had gone through the ceremony they went off, but the person not being cured they collected a great many people and on Monday last returned to Aston pretending to have a warrant to justify their proceedings. Then with uncommon brutality they took the poor creature from her house, stripped her quite naked, and after tying her hands and legs together threw her in a horse pond. She was then taken out, and in this shameful condition exhibited for the sport of an inhuman mob. As she did not sink they concluded she really was a witch, and several returning the following day determined to discipline her in this cruel manner until they should put an end to her wretched existence. The posse was not sufficiently strong, so she escaped for that time. The consideration of the old woman being over 80 years of age, and of her being a pauper and friendless, render it the duty of magistrates to exert themselves to bring to punishment these atrocious offenders.

There was also the strange tale that came to light in 1778. A house in Earl Shilton, was said to be plagued by its former long dead occupant. Tables and chairs were known to dance about the room, while pewter dishes jumped off the shelves but alarm was worse when wigs and hats flew off the heads of their wearers. Villagers agreed that the disturbed spirit was a local man who could not rest in his grave because he had been defrauded in life. (Palmer 2002)

=== Peg-Leg Watts and the stocks ===
In 1705, the payment by the Reeve for Shilton manor was £34 8s 6 1/4d. The Reeve was voted into office annually by the freeholders of the parish. There were 61 freeholders who voted in 1719, but this number had dropped to 28 by 1785.

The Overseer of the manor had various facets to his job. Daniel Marvin, Overseer in 1755, made charges of 5 shillings for ale at the burial of a pauper.

In 1760, Alderman Gabriel Newton, of Leicester gave to Earl Shilton and Barwell £20 16s from his charity, for the educating of 20 poor boys from each village.

James Perrott was a successful surgeon who worked in Earl Shilton. He married the widow, Lady Ann Sharpe, and they lived in the village for over 40 years, until she died 1791, at the age of 62 years.

Famous for his prowess as a wrestler Samuel Marvin also lived in Earl Shilton.

The last person to be incarcerated in the Earl Shilton stocks was a man called 'Peg-leg Watts' for a now unknown offence. The stocks were situated opposite the old churchyard. Also in the vicinity there was the village round house or gaol or lock-up,. Unfortunately all traces of which have now disappeared.

Earl Shilton Inclosure Act 1778
- Act of Parliament
- Parliament of Great Britain
- Long title: An Act for dividing, allotting and enclosing, the Open Fields, Meadows and Commons, in the Lordship of Earl Shilton, in the County of Leicester.
- Citation: 18 Geo. 3. c. 40 Pr.
- Territorial extent: Great Britain

Dates
- Royal assent: 27 March 1778
- Commencement: 20 November 1777 (Note: Start of session.)

Status: Current legislation

An inclosure act, the Earl Shilton Inclosure Act 1778 (18 Geo. 3. c. 40 Pr.), was passed on 27 March 1778. Earl Shilton's open fields, meadows and 1,500 acres (6 km^{2}) of heath land were all enclosed. Thomas, Viscount Wentworth, was entitled to all small tithes vicarial dues in Shilton.

Scrymshire Boothby had the entitlement of the great tithes, payment in lieu of tithes, hay and meadow lands in Hall fields and Breach field. The following year Scrymshire Boothby sold Tooley Park to John Dod, and the remainder of the estate was divided.

Shilton Heath, famed for over a century for its steeple chasing, was gone for good.

Viscount Wentworth also had his lands in Elmsthorpe enclosed, including an extensive rabbit warren. He exchanged these after 1778 for 2 acres (8,100 m^{2}) of land in Shilton parish.

=== Earl Shilton Turnpike ===
The turnpike trust had two toll gates at Earl Shilton. One at the bottom of Shilton Hill, which was kept by a man called Harrison for many years. The other tollgate was where the Belle Vue road meets the Hinckley road. Travellers were said to have gone around by Elmesthorpe to avoid the gate and its tolls.

The gates were administered by the turnpike trusts, but were bid for every year by prospective candidates, which led to local corruption. Bribes were offered to win the contract, and not all of the money was spent on the upkeep of the roads. Many small parishes like Earl Shilton had a large mileage of roads within their boundaries and found it well-nigh impossible to maintain them.

Roads and pathways were very bad indeed. Cart-ruts ran deep down the main streets and the stones on the old "corseys" (footpaths) must have been very dangerous at times. Loose stone was very often strewn about, and it remained for the carts to roll them in, and in the era of the toll-gate the wider the wheels the less toll they paid to go through them. A great handicap, however, was that these carts often followed in the existing ruts as a matter of course, and so made them worse. Roads and repairs were paid for through the Vestry, which had replaced the Barons Court of the 17th century. The Vestry met for many years in the Plough Inn, Church Street, setting the parson's rate, church rate, poor rate, overseers rate, watch rate and the highway rate for the parish.

Stagecoaches passed frequently through Earl Shilton, it being on the route to Hinckley and Birmingham from Leicester. Coaches with names such as The Accommodation, The Magnet and The Alexander were all running in 1830. Coaches stopped at a place near to the White House in Wood Street, beside the Lord Nelson Inn. On one tragic occasion a coach overturned near to the entrance of Burbage Common and a man was killed in the resulting wreckage.

In 1800 there were 249 inhabited houses in Earl Shilton, with a further 8 uninhabited. The population stood at 1,287, 655 males and 632 females. Agriculture employed 118 villagers, while the 716 people employed in trade and manufacture showed the dramatic rise of stocking manufacture.

=== The latter days of knitwear industry ===
The economy of the village in the 19th century was based mainly on boots and stockings. Stocking makers worked ten, twelve and even 15 hours a day at their frames, for seven or eight shillings per week. Frame rents were high and varied from one shilling to three shillings per week. Poverty and disease were rife. In Hinckley there was a framework knitters' strike in 1824. Two years later, disorder in the town was quelled when a detachment of lancers arrived, killing one man.

The Earl Shilton village population had risen to 2,017 by 1831.

Many Earl Shilton people in the 1840s became destitute and sought refuge in the Union Workhouse at Hinckley, locally known as "The Bastille". Economic conditions had become very bad, the decade became spoken of as the "Hungry Forties". Queen Victoria ordered an inquiry into the distress, and in 1843 sent a commission headed by a Mr. Muggeridge, who obtained much information from interviewing work-people and employers. Earl Shilton frame-work knitters and hosiers gave evidence at the enquiry. Rich Wileman, of Shilton, described himself as the oldest stocking manufacturer in the kingdom, and stated that many thousands of dozens of socks were sent to the American market every year.

At a time when a reasonable daily wage was 4/-, a report showed the weekly earnings in 27 parishes varied from 4/- to 8/- a week, Hinckley district being 5/3, Bosworth 4/6, Ibstock 4/- and Shepshed 5/6. Frame rents in the cottages were high and varied in different parishes from 1/- to 3/- per week. This rent and the addition of the Truck Act 1831, made poverty and disease rife in the Leicestershire parishes. The Truck Act stated that goods had to be paid for in cash instead of in kind and, as usual, hit the poorest the hardest. Had it not been for their allotments grounds, things would have been much worse, as it was many were close to starvation.

Sheep stealing, highway robbery and burglary were common in the 1840s. It was not safe to go out after dark. If a man was caught sheep stealing, he was sentenced to 14 years transportation, which was also the sentence for anyone who was driven by hunger to take a pheasant from the woods.

In 1844 there were in Shilton alone 650 stocking frames. Mr. J. Homer, giving evidence to the commission, said that the whole of these were in the houses of the workpeople at that time. Neither the workshop, nor the factory system was in operation in Earl Shilton until after the findings of the commission were made public.

Stocking making in the home quickly died out with the introduction of the factory system. Both the boot and shoe and the hosiery industry eagerly took to the new system of working and for the first time people began to be regulated by time, as the factory needed villagers to work in unison. The last known stocking-frame in Earl Shilton disappeared when its owner, a man named Mr. Pratt, who lived in Wood Street, died.

Earl Shilton saw its first hosiery strike in 1859. The employers involved were Messrs. Homer & Everard. Almost 130 operatives took strike action, and an appeal was sent out to workers of three counties for aid for the Earl Shilton strikers to fight it.

=== Parish church ===
Church of SS Simon and Jude, Earl Shilton

=== The Old Volunteers ===
Many Shilton men joined the old 'Volunteers', belonging to the Hinckley Company; these were later incorporated in the 'Militia'. Clad in their red jackets, blue trousers and pipe clayed trimmings with pointed helmets, it is said that on Saturday nights Earl Shilton resembled a garrison town when everyone wore their uniform.

The Leicestershire Mercury was first published in 1836. Newspapers in the 18th and 19th century were very few, and many Shiltonians brought up before the First World War remembered when one copy was shared by several families. These were read aloud in the candlelight of the poor homes of the villagers, the few people able to read being in great demand. The old Candle House, where candles were made, stood for many years in Almeys Lane, and during renovations to the Baptist Chapel much brickwork of the Candle House was incorporated in the building.

Election days in the village were, prior to the universal franchise, very hectic. The candidates usually arrived at the polling stations (usually the schools) in horse cabs. They were often assaulted by the crowds, and top hats worn in those days were often sent flying. Many of the rougher element were given beer and locked up for the day to preserve the peace.

Morris dancing took place on Plough Monday, when the dancers went round the village to collect money. If this was refused they entered the house and refused to quit until ransom was paid either in cash or food. Fishing nets on long canes were carried to reach bedroom windows where they had locked doors. German bands also visited the village, as did travelling bears, which danced to music.

In 1861 the village crier was Thomas Foster, who advertised sales, meetings and public news. The last man to hold this post was a blind man called Bannister, who also made baskets.

Houses in the village were rented by groups of men who, when they had finished their work, then "shopped it", or took it, to some central depot in the village, and were usually paid each trip. 'Sweaters', or child labour, were often exploited, and regularly after a period of drunkenness these sweaters were compelled to sit working all night with their elders to make up for lost time. Many worked from the age of eight or nine, in the local parlance "got more kicks than half pence."

=== Job Toon ===
In the middle of the 19th century Job Toon began trading as a grocer and licensed victualler in Earl Shilton. Job was a devout Methodist, and his shop was still trading in 1868. In 1850 he installed his first stocking frame in his home, which laid the foundations of J Toon and Son. He worked the stocking frame with his wife Matilda, and gradually purchased more frames and rented them out in the community. Job would pay for the stockings produced, minus the rent of the frame. Job purchased a small building just off Wood Street, and the early factory was powered by steam. Horse and drey took the factory produce to Elmesthorpe station.

Job Toon had three sons Alfred, James and Carey. Alfred and James went into the hosiery business, while Carey became a successful local farmer. Alfred was the senior partner and earned a salary of £5 per week. In those early days stockings were not so delicate and were sold by weight, warmth not high fashion appears to be paramount as the heaviest were the most expensive. In this period much of Toon’s trade was with South America. Alfred had four sons, two of them died in the 1930s, and his two surviving sons, Stanley and Carey, took over the firm that now operated over 1,000 knitting machines.

=== The Wake ===
The 'Wake', or local fair, was a holiday in Earl Shilton and held always held on the last Sunday in October, traditionally on the saints day of the parish church. According to old accounts in the parish, Ale drunk on Feast Day (Wake) in 1809 was £5 12s. 0d, and in 1820 £6 5s. 6d. People had a full week’s holiday from work, public houses were open all day, and "captains" were elected to take charge of the singing. The captain was also responsible for the whips round for beer, which entitled all and sundry to drink together and so retain the company.

The wide portion of the Hollow, nearest the Wesleyan Chapel, was the earliest site for the Wake amusements. The stalls and roundabouts extended the full length of Wood Street. The wakes also incorporated a procession around the village.

Mr. Hopkins, a well-known resident of Keat’s Lane, was a proprietor of amusements. A large boat on wheels, and drawn by horses, went the whole length of the village, for the use of the children.

At the turn of the 20th century a field in Station road also became the site for the annual wake or fair. The amusement part of the "Wakes," roundabouts, etc., were very prominent on this field.

On the other side of the road there were also numerous entertainments from time to time, including those well-known "Strolling Players" of Holloway’s Theatre. Many people enjoyed these shows and were able to see fresh plays every night in the players' stay at Shilton. No one may now recall the plays "Maria Martin and the Red Barn," "The Face at the Window," "The Dumb Man of Manchester," but they did draw crowds.

=== The Pinfold ===
An old stone building, which stood near to the Baptist Chapel, was known as the Pinfold. This was a place for penning stray cattle prior to the enclosure of the common fields in 1758. It was latterly used as a place for weighing stone from the old Parish Quarry.

In the village a knocker-up was employed in the 1880s and for over 50 years ensured that people attended the early Sunday morning classes.

=== The Old Smock Mill ===
The Old Smock Mill stood near to the Parish Quarry. Built around 1800, at a cost of £800, it stood for over a century before being demolished. It was a noted landmark and a favourite place for rambles and picnics. There were two other mills in Earl Shilton, one stood on the Wood Street Recreational ground near the 'Mount', while the other was near the top of Birds Hill.

It is possible to go the whole length of "Old Shilton" without touching the main street, via a maze of paths known as "The Backs." The reason for their preservation is believed to be that the old field pathways have kept their rights of way throughout the centuries, and the haphazard planning of the straggling village made desirable the small alleys leading to the main street.

Wood Street, locally known as Wood End, is the way leading to the wood referred to in the Domesday Survey, via the "Heath Lane," which was noted in the 17th century for steeple chasing. The Raven family possessed an enormous mangle. This was considered to be an outsize of its kind, and washing came from the village to The Hollow to be mangled by it.

The Workhouse Gardens and Spring Gardens are names to be conjured with in this area near the church. No doubt both had great bearing in the life of the community in bygone days. Rackett Court once stood near to the "Hill Top." These were old Tudor buildings, and a flue sketch of them can be seen in "Highways and Byways of Leicestershire." A recluse by the name of John Freestone was the last occupant. On the opposite side of the road is an ancient barn, containing very massive oak beams. This gives the name to this part of the locality of the Barn-end.

There are a few old Georgian three-storied houses around "Hill Top," and a very old thatched house opposite the "Roebuck Inn," with date on the front of the year 1714. It is one of the very few thatched ones surviving in Shilton. Keats Lane was formerly known as "Cake Lane," and once it contained many old-fashioned houses. It overlooks the Vale of Kirkby and other scenery.

A bake-house was situated many years ago near to Whitemore’s factory, and a bell was rung when the oven was hot. This was when the bread was made at home and sent to the bakers. This is probably, too, the origination of "Cake Lane." There was also a bake house in Candle Maker Alley, a small lane running between Almys Lane and the top of The Meadows, where between the World Wars, local folk would take their roasts along to be cooked in the oven.

Near to the present West Street stood the old Yew Tree Farm, prior to the erection of the present Jubilee Terrace. A malt-house once stood on this spot, and when it was demolished a large wall was built with the bricks, facing the present "Fender Row." This wall has now disappeared with the building of the Council houses.

The "Dog and Gun Inn" was removed in the 1930s to another site at Keat’s Lane, a little distance from where the old licensed house had sold beer for over 150 years. This old building still exists today as a private house.

There was also in Keat’s Lane, up until the 1940s, a glove business that used hand frames, and was run by Mr Linney. Spindle Hall, close by, was the last dwelling house in memory to contain the old glove frames. "Wightmans Row" and the old "Glove-Yard" have, like many more old houses, been demolished.

=== Trade and the Civil War in America ===
In 1861 the American Civil War broke out, and Earl Shilton was hard hit by the Union blockade of the Confederate States' ports, preventing cotton exports. Conditions akin to famine prevailed in Earl Shilton as the chief trade of the area was frame-work knitting, carried out in nearly every house. The Baptist minister, the Rev. Parkinson, had to resign through lack of funds. The Rev. Freesdon said "that a church that could not support its minister, and a pastorate that had commenced with so many signs of blessing, ended through a war raging on the other side of the Atlantic".

At this time building of Elmesthorpe Road was begun as relief work. Many of the workers received no more than bread and meat for their labour. At this time more than 1,200 people were out of employment. The work was sponsored by the Earl of Lovelace and his daughter, the Lady Anne Noel, and carried out in 1862–63. They also forwarded £800 to the unemployed cotton workers to work worsted instead of cotton.

The depression seemed to continue for many years, and the figures given by the Hinckley District Relief Committee in July, 1864, make interesting reading - Subscriptions raised in Earl Shilton parish were to the amount of £161 1s. 4d, while the destitute poor received from that fund £992 10s. 4d., in addition 195 barrels (31.0 m^{3}) of flour, 30 sides of bacon, 100 tons of coal and left-off clothing were distributed by this fund in the district.

Toward the end of the 19th century several pieces of land were held by the parish as charitable lands. They were Town Land Meadow, Town Land Close, the Barn Close (near Hill Top), the Old Close and part of Breach Field. These lands were rented out and the income used for poor relief. Among other relief the poor of the parish would receive bread at Easter and Coal at Christmas. Allotments were also set-aside for the poor. One set of plots was at the bottom of Shilton Hill and a second in the Townlands off Breach Lane.

=== The Brick Works and Gas Works ===
Station road was known as Breach Lane before the railway arrived, and with the exception of "The Lodge" and a few houses near to the Hollow it was very thinly populated.

The old brickworks were situated on the site of present Metcalfe Street, which was named after Mr. James Metcalfe, for many years a headmaster at the High Street Church of England School.

The Gas Works (now dismantled) were also situated in Station road, and were built in 1866 by the Earl Shilton Gas Light and Coke Company. Mr A Lee was the manager.

=== The Social Institute ===
The Social Institute (known locally as the 'Stute') was founded at the turn of the 20th century to provide a social and sporting outlet for the young men of Earl Shilton. Its first home was in two rooms above the H.U.D.C. gas showroom in Wood Street.

A Grand Bazaar was held in Earl Shilton on 28–29 December 1908, at the High Street School, to raise funds for a new building for the Social Institute. There was also a public subscription, and a mortgage guaranteed by local industrialists, who were the founders and formed the Management Committee. The new premises were built in Station Road in 1909. The Institute organised football, cricket, chess club, skittles and billiards, and had a rifle range. The building is now used by the community and has 5 full size snooker tables and hosts regular Ju Jitsu classes and Little Stars play school and a food bank once a week.

=== Harrys ===
Annually circuses and wild animal shows were held in Earl Shilton, before to the advent of the cinema.

In 1910 the Royal Rink roller skating rink was opened. Later Mr H S Cooper converted it into the Picture House cinema. It was popularly nicknamed 'Harrys'. After the Second World War generations grew up attending the Saturday matinees at the Picture House, or sessions at the new, outdoor, roller skating rink built beside it. The grandeur of the old Royal Rink could never match the Danilo or Gaumont in Hinckley, but it still drew a sizeable crowd. In the 1960s the cinema was taken over by Mr Cooper's daughter Freda, and her husband Jack Aldridge, who had formerly run a local taxi firm.

=== Roman Catholic church and Normanton Hall ===
The Roman Catholic church of St Peter was built in 1908 in Mill Lane. The Roman Catholic school next to it was built in 1910 for the education of 80 children. A convent and priest’s house were added later. The church was under the patronage of the Worswick family, who had their country seat at Normanton Hall (now demolished), which was outside Earl Shilton on the road to Thurleston.

In the First World War, German prisoners of war were held at Normanton Hall. A fire destroyed Normanton Hall in 1925, and the property was subsequently sold off. Shortly after the demolition of the house, the ornate altar was presented to St Peter's church. A fire in the 1940s, destroyed part of the building.

The convent was several times empty in the 1930s and 1940s, but was reconditioned and used as a seminary until 1949 by the Congregation of the Sacred Heart Fathers, when, having outgrown the premises, the seminary moved to Woodcote Hall in Shropshire. It was for some years also used as a hosiery factory.

In 1983 a new Roman Catholic Church of SS Peter and Paul was completed in Melton Street.

=== Boy Scouts ===
The first Boy Scouts troop was formed around 1916. The original Master for the Earl Shilton troop was Mr Horace Perkins, and Mr W Cotton was president.

Mr Perkins recalled - 'Much of the Scouts equipment was homemade. In the early days we water proofed heavy bed sheets and would sew them into tents'. The Scout troop took part in the World Jamboree, at Olympia, London in 1920. During the Jamboree they camped at Barnet, Hertfordshire.

=== First World War ===
A thousand men from Earl Shilton served in UK forces in the First World War. Many men from Earl Shilton, in the Fifth Battalion, the Leicestershire Regiment, also served in Ireland in the 1916 Easter Rising. The village factories also supplied the Government with thousands of pairs of socks and army boots. These same manufacturers also supplied vast orders for the Russian Cossacks.

In the latter part of the war, Earl Shilton held a 'big gun week', when a large howitzer was paraded around the village. Many were invited to buy War Bonds. Military bands often visited the village to inspire recruiting. In a very different age when information was seriously censored and patriotism was paramount, young men clamoured to join up. In one week alone 80 enlisted, and were cheered on by crowds of happy followers as they marched to Elmesthorpe station on their way to the Western Front.

Hostilities ended on 11 November 1918. All work was suspended for the day, while flags and bunting appeared in windows. Fireworks were let off and a comic band toured the streets. Watching silently were the German prisoners of war who were working in the area and billeted at nearby Normanton Hall.

A captured field gun stood for a time near the Wesleyan Chapel, and was removed for a time to a field off station road. The gun's final resting place was the Wood Street Recreation Ground, which was once a sand pit, where the gun was later buried.

More than 100 men from the village were killed in the conflict, and a cenotaph was erected in their memory. Two soldiers, both Earl Shilton men, who died in 1916 and 1917, are buried in the parish churchyard. On wake Sunday 1919, and for many years afterwards, the British Legion, public bodies and factories held a parade for the dead.

=== Second World War ===
In the Second World War there were 192 air raid alerts in Earl Shilton, the first occurring on 26 June 1940 and the last on 20 March 1945. The village siren was erected on the factory of Toon and Son in Wood Street. Many villagers had shelters put in their gardens, but there were also public shelters in Wood Street, Station Road, Almey’s Lane, Keats Lane, The Hollow and Belle Vue.

The Home Guard, was organised in June 1940. They had their headquarters in a large house near Birds Hill called 'Holydene'. Three parachute mines were dropped on the night of 20 November 1940. One landed in Barwell while the other two came down in the Northwest corner of Earl Shilton. One of these mines failed to explode, and there were no casualties.

More incendiaries fell in Elmesthorpe on 4 December 1940. The German plane was brought down near Leicester Forest East. The Earl Shilton Home Guard were called out to the scene and prisoners were taken.

At 7am on 27 July 1942, a lone German bomber dived out of the clouds near the church and let go of three stick bombs. They landed at the back of Mr T Carter’s farm in Church Street, destroying a barn and badly damaging a house. Mr Carter had a very lucky escape himself, as he was out in his yard at the time only 20 yards (20 m) from the blast. A bull was so badly injured that it had to be put down. The plane went on to machine gun those unfortunate enough to be going to work.

At the top end of the village, the Air Raid Patrol wardens, met in the back room of the Plough, a Public House then run by Joe Lucas. They patrolled the streets checking the blackout and fire watching.

There was a munitions factory opened in the village. The village also took child refugees from Coventry, Birmingham and London.

Soldiers were billeted in most of the public buildings in the war. The military authorities requisitioned the Working Men's Club dance hall, the Adult School Hall, the Social Institute, Constitutional Club, and the Co-op village hall. After the Dunkirk evacuation, the Sussex Yeomanry moved into the village, being replaced in turn by the Royal Army Ordnance Corps, Royal Artillery, Royal Marines and the Pioneer Corps. The Wesleyan Chapel in the Hollow was transformed into a British Restaurant, for the troops. Training was undertaken on the recreation grounds and other open spaces around the village. Mr Astley’s sand pit in Heath Lane was used as a shooting range.

About 900 local men and women served in the UK armed forces, of whom 25 were killed on active service. One local man, Ordinary Seaman Ernest Holt, of HMS Mohawk, who died in October 1939, is buried in the parish churchyard Two soldiers are buried in the separate Earl Shilton Cemetery.

== Industry ==
William Iliffe introduced the knitting frame to Hinckley in 1640. In 1694, Sir Verney Noel, of Kirkby Mallory, left £100 for the poor children of Earl Shilton to be sent to London, to be taught the art of Framework Kitting.

Between the 19th and late 20th centuries, Earl Shilton was an industrial village with numerous shoe, hosiery and knitwear factories. The boot and shoe factories included Orton's, Eatough's and Pinchess's, and other, smaller, operations. At one time Earl Shilton produced boots for the Russian army.

Many of these businesses have now closed due to competition, but a few continue into the 21st century. Alongside the boot and shoe trade other businesses thrived, including local carriers such as Woodwards (now the bakery distribution business) and Crowfoots (still operating as a parcel carrier). Both of these businesses are now based nearby in Barwell.

The Earl Shilton Building Society was established in the village in 1857 and still has its head office here. In 2025 it was the second-smallest building society in the UK.

== Transport ==
The town is on the A47 road, with a bypass opened in 2009. Bus services come from Arriva Midlands and Stagecoach Midlands, with services running around the town to Hinckley, Nuneaton and Leicester.

The South Leicestershire Railway, formed in 1850, extended its line to Elmesthorpe where a station was built to serve Earl Shilton and Barwell in 1863. It closed in 1968. The nearest railway station today is at Hinckley.

== Education ==
=== Earliest school ===
Thomas Green succeeded to the Baptist Church in Earl Shilton and in 1801, started the village's first school, where reading and writing were taught, as well as elementary knowledge of the Christian faith. In 1850 John Green kept the school and was the master. He was given notice to quit; having displeased the Church. The notice, however, was cancelled and he was advised to "keep things in order." This school kept going until 1858, when the Church of England Schools were built. The Church of England Schools had room for 200 children and cost £1,050 to build, the money being raised by subscription and grants. One school stood in the High Street and another in Wood Street.

=== Wood Street School ===
In 1871 Wood Street School opened for around 30 pupils and the headmistress was a Miss Witnall. Wood Street was a very small school with only 2 classrooms. In 1907 they added 2 extra classrooms and a corridor, as village expansion led to overcrowding at the school. By 1965, numbers had risen to such a degree that they used the church hall for school dinners, physical education and music and movement sessions. Wood Street School was partly burned down in the early hours of 17 January 1984, following a break in. The curtains were set alight which in turn ignited an oil feed pipe, causing major damage and ultimately the school's demolition.

=== Present day ===
Four primary schools serve the town, as well as the secondary school Heath Lane Academy (formed in 2016 by the merger of William Bradford Academy and Heathfield Academy) in the north of the town.

== Media ==
Television signals are received from either the Waltham or Sutton Coldfield TV transmitters. The town is served by both BBC CWR and BBC Radio Leicester. Other radio stations including Capital East Midlands, Smooth East Midlands, Hits Radio East Midlands, Greatest Hits Radio Midlands and Carillon Radio, a community based station. The town is served by these newspapers, Leicester Mercury, Hinckley Times and Earl Shilton News which is an online local newspaper.

== Sport ==
Earl Shelton has played many sports, especially cricket. The present Earl Shilton Town Cricket Club play at Keats Lane to the north of the town. Sam Coe (1873-1956), Arthur Hampson (1878-1952), Loni Brown and Joe Brown were all selected for county honours. Billy Ball and George Panter, of an older generation, were also outstanding. Earl Shilton had a regular fixture at one period with Coventry and North Warwickshire Sports Club.

Shilton Victors, a football team who had their headquarters at the "King William IV" public house, won three cups in a single day, a very noteworthy achievement. Most of the factories in the village ran sides for the benefit of the Earl Shilton Sunshine League. These matches were played after tea when work ceased, and very keen rivalry was witnessed, and good football without the frills was usually served up for the large crowds that assembled. Mr. H. Bradbury presented a silver cup that was played for each year by knock-out competition. The venue for these hectic matches was in a field off Station Road at the rear of the Constitutional Club. By 1923 Earl Shilton had many football clubs playing. The church and chapel fielded useful sides, also very often second elevens. The Adult School fielded three sides for quite a long time, and rented two fields, one which was situated on The Mount. The town's present-day football team, Earl Shilton Albion FC play in the Leicestershire Senior League Division One, and their home stadium is Stoneycroft Park. Bob Newton (1946–2009), a professional footballer who appeared in Football League matches for Leicester City and Bradford City, was born in Earl Shilton.

Norman Dagley (1930-1999) was born and raised in Earl Shilton and when he turned 14, like most boys of his time he joined The Earl Shilton Social Institute and there under the tutoring of Reg and Jack Wright he learned the game of billiards. Norman was a naturally gifted billiards player and won many county and national competitions and eventually he turned professional and reached the world professional championship in 1977. Norman became the first billiard player to win all the major billiard trophies in one season. Since his death Norman’s trophies and cue and case are on display in The Stute snooker hall near his favourite table 3.

Foot racing was once very popular, and many wagers were run for around the local fields. On one occasion the village sweep who was to cycle on his three-wheeler, challenged a well-known local runner to race from Shilton Hill to Kirkby, the runner to have the length of the hill start. The runner was easily passed down the Kirkby Lane and retired.

Between the World Wars Earl Shilton boasted a horticultural society, which held an annual flower and sports event in a field in Kings Walk. Cycle racing, high jumps, donkey racing and all manner of foot racing were part of its programme.

A short lived greyhound racing track was opened during 1928. The racing was independent (not affiliated to the sports governing body the National Greyhound Racing Club) and was known as a flapping track, which was the nickname given to independent tracks.

== Bibliography ==
- Biggs, JT (1912). Leicester: Sanitation versus Vaccination. Its Vital Statistics Compared With Those of Other Towns, The Army, Japan, And England And Wales. The National Anti-Vaccination League.
- Crouch, David (2002). The Normans: The History of a Dynasty. Hambledon: Continuum. ISBN 978-1852853877.
- Foster, GH (1940). History of Earl Shilton Tooley Park and Potters Marston. Baxter.
- Foster, GH (1947). History of Earl Shilton and Tooley Park. Baxter.
- "'". The Gentleman's Magazine. Vol. XLVI. 1776.
- Lawrence, John N (2006). Associations with Earl Shilton, a Leicestershire Village.
- "'". Transactions of the Leicestershire Archaeological Society. 28. Leicestershire Archaeological Society. 1952.
- Mathews, AG (1948). Walker Revised. London: Oxford University Press. p. 237.
- Morris, Mark (2003). Earl Shilton Castle. Pan Books.
- Nichols, John (1811). History and Antiquities of the County of Leicester. Vol. IV. pp. 774–780.
- Schama, Simon (2003). A History of Britain: At the Edge of the World? 3000 BC-AD 1603. BBC. ISBN 0-563-48714-3.
- Wace. The Companions of William the Conqueror.
- Wood, Michael (1988). The Domesday Book.
- The Crusades

== External sources ==
- Earl Shilton Town Council
- "Earl Shilton". Hinckley Past & Present. – history timeline
- "Earl Shilton and Barwell Photographic Archive". Hinckley Past & Present.
- Earl Shilton Skatepark and Park
