= Fornham =

Fornham may refer to the following places in Suffolk, England:

- Fornham All Saints
- Fornham St Genevieve
- Fornham St Martin
