= Samuel Coe =

English cricketer

Personal information
- Full name: Samuel Coe
- Born: 3 June 1873; Earl Shilton, Leicestershire, England
- Died: 4 November 1955 (aged 82); Earl Shilton
- Batting: Left-handed
- Bowling: Left-arm slow-medium

Domestic team information
- Years: Team
- 1896 to 1923: Leicestershire
- 1900 to 1904: London County

Career statistics
Competition	First-class
Matches	452
Runs scored	17438
Batting average	24.69
100s/50s	19/82
Top score	252 not out
Balls bowled	22448
Wickets	335
Bowling average	32.20
5 wickets in innings	3
10 wickets in match	0
Best bowling	6/38
Catches/stumpings	176/0
- Source: Cricinfo, 22 May 2014

Samuel Coe (3 June 1873 – 4 November 1955) was an English first-class cricketer. He was a left-hand batsman and left-arm slow-medium bowler who played for Leicestershire.

Born in Earl Shilton, Leicestershire, Coe made a total of 448 appearances for his home county over a 27-year period. He also twice played for London County, once for the Players against Gentlemen in 1908 and once for an England XI against the touring Australians of 1909.

Coe scored 17,438 first-class runs at an average of 24.69 and passed 1,000 for a season seven times. His best seasonal total was 1,258 in 1914 which included his best innings of 252 not out against Northamptonshire in four hours. This score was Coe's only double century and remained the county's highest score until beaten by Phil Simmons in 1994.

Coe's bowling returned 335 wickets at 32.20, with a best of 6/38 against London County in 1903. He passed 50 wickets in a season once, when in 1905 he claimed 52 at 22.38.

In July 1900, Coe became the first county victim of Bernard Bosanquet's innovation, the googly. The ball reportedly bounced four times before Coe was out stumped for 98.
