= Heath Lane Academy =

Location
- Heath Lane; Earl Shilton, Leicestershire, LE9 7PD; England; 52°34′32″N 1°20′02″W

Information
- Type: Academy
- Local authority: Leicestershire
- Department for Education URN: 138327 Tables
- Ofsted: Reports
- Principal: Mark Trimingham
- Gender: Coeducational
- Age: 11 to 16
- Enrolment: 557
- Website: https://www.heathlaneacademy.org.uk/

Heath Lane Academy is a co-educational secondary school and sixth form located in Earl Shilton, Leicestershire, England. It was previously known as William Bradford Academy, William Bradford Community College and, before this, as Earl Shilton Community College. In summer 2016, the nearby Heathfield Academy closed and merged with William Bradford Academy at their site with the new academy rebranded as Heath Lane Academy (HLA).

== Overseas links ==
As of 1998, the college has links to Mianyang Nanshan Bilingual School in the Sichuan province of the People's Republic of China. Many visits between schools have occurred, the most recent of which was in July 2009. Twelve students and two teachers from Earl Shilton visited Mianyang for scientific studies.

== Academic performance ==
100% of students passed five GCSEs at grade C or above for the academic year 2010/11.

4% of students passed A-level examinations (A-E grades) in the academic year 2010/11.
