= Bob Newton (footballer, born 1946) =

English footballer

Personal information
- Full name: Robert Arthur Newton
- Date of birth: 19 January 1946
- Place of birth: Earl Shilton, England
- Date of death: 25 October 2009 (aged 63)
- Place of death: Hinckley, England
- Position: Winger

Youth career
- Leicester City

Senior career*
Years	Team	Apps	(Gls)
1963–1965	Leicester City	2	(0)
1965–1966	Bradford City	20	(4)
- Wellington Town
- Tamworth
- Nuneaton Borough
- Worcester City
Total		22	(4)
- * Club domestic league appearances and goals

Robert Arthur Newton (19 January 1946 – 25 October 2009) was an English professional footballer who played as a winger.

== Career ==
Born in Earl Shilton, Newton began his career with Leicester City. He joined Bradford City in May 1965. He made 20 league appearances for the club, scoring 4 goals, also made one FA Cup and one Football League Cup appearance. He was released by the club in 1966. He later played for Wellington Town, Tamworth, Nuneaton Borough and Worcester City.

== Sources ==
- Frost, Terry (1988). Bradford City A Complete Record 1903-1988. Breedon Books Sport. ISBN 0-907969-38-0.
