= Arthur Hampson =

English cricketer

Personal information
- Full name: Arthur Harry Hampson
- Born: 21 May 1878; Earl Shilton, Leicestershire, England
- Died: 24 May 1952 (aged 74); Earl Shilton, Leicestershire, England
- Batting: Right-handed
- Role: Wicket-keeper

Domestic team information
- Years: Team
- 1905–1906: Leicestershire

Career statistics
Competition	First-class
Matches	11
Runs scored	100
Batting average	7.14
100s/50s	–/–
Top score	23
Balls bowled	–
Wickets	–
Bowling average	–
5 wickets in innings	–
10 wickets in match	–
Best bowling	–
Catches/stumpings	9/7
- Source: Cricinfo, 25 January 2013

Arthur Harry Hampson (21 May 1878 – 24 November 1952) was an English cricketer. Hampson was a right-handed batsman who fielded as a wicket-keeper. He was born at Earl Shilton, Leicestershire.

Hampson made his first-class debut for Leicestershire against Sussex in the 1905 County Championship at Aylestone Road, Leicester. He made ten further first-class appearances for the county, the last of which came against Worcestershire in the 1906 County Championship. In his ten appearances, Hampson scored 100 runs at an average of 7.14, with a high score of 23. Behind the stumps he took nine catches and made seven stumpings.

He died at the village of his birth on 24 November 1952.
