= Groby Pool and Woods =

Protected area in Leicestershire, England

Coordinates: 52.669°N 1.233°W

- Site of Special Scientific Interest
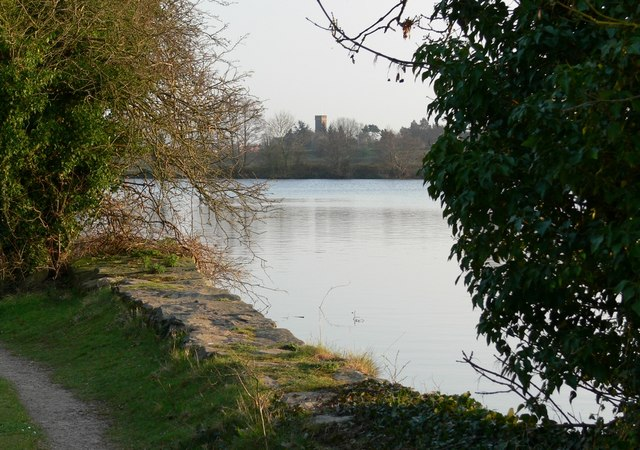
- Location of Groby Pool and Woods.
- Area of search: Leicestershire
- Grid reference: SK 519 082
- Interest: Biological
- Area: 29.0 hectares
- Notification date: 1983
- Location map: Magic Map

Groby Pool and Woods is a 29 hectare biological Site of Special Scientific Interest north of Groby in Leicestershire.

Groby Pool is the largest natural lake in the county, and it is used by many wintering wildfowl. The marginal vegetation is diverse, and there is also wet woodland and meadows which have grasses such as common bent, sweet vernal grass and crested dog's-tail.

There are footpaths through the site.
