= Battle of Fornham =

Battle in 1173 in England during the Revolt of 1173-74

- Part of the Revolt of 1173–74
Date	17 October 1173
Location	near today's Fornham St Genevieve, Fornham All Saints and Fornham St Martin in Suffolk
Result	Crown victory

Belligerents
Rebels	English Crown

Commanders and leaders
Robert de Beaumont (POW)	Richard de Lucy; Humphrey de Bohun; Reginald de Dunstanville; William of Gloucester; William d'Aubigny

Units involved
Cavalry contingent, Flemish mercenaries	Contingent of knights, additional military supporters and troops levied from land holdings, local peasantry

Strength
~3,000	300+

Casualties and losses
Cavalry forces captured, majority of mercenaries killed	Unknown

The Battle of Fornham was fought during the Revolt of 1173–1174.

== Background ==
The revolt began in April 1173 and resulted from the efforts of King Henry II of England to find lands for his youngest son, Prince John. John's other three legitimate brothers (Henry, Richard, and Geoffrey) objected and fled to the court of King Louis VII of France, where they raised a rebellion. The rebelling sons and Louis secured a number of allies and invaded Normandy, and the Scottish king invaded England. The invasions failed, and negotiations between the rebels and the English king were started but resulted in no peace. Robert de Beaumont, the Earl of Leicester, then decided to invade England with a force of Flemish mercenaries. He landed at Walton, Suffolk, in late September or early October.

Leicester attempted to join forces with another rebel, Hugh Bigod, the Earl of Norfolk, who was based at the castle of Framlingham. After some inconclusive fighting, Leicester decided to lead his men to his own base of Leicester but was prevented by royalist forces.

The earl's base there had recently come under attack by royal forces and thus needed reinforcement, but another reason for the movement may have been friction between de Beaumont and Bigod and Bigod's wife, Gundreda.

== Battle ==
The battle was fought on 17 October 1173 between rebel forces, under the command of Leicester, and royal forces, under the command of Richard de Lucy, the Chief Justiciar, as well as Humphrey de Bohun Lord High Constable; Reginald de Dunstanville, the Earl of Cornwall; William of Gloucester, the Earl of Gloucester; and William d'Aubigny, the Earl of Arundel. The rebel forces were numbered at 3000 mercenaries, and the royal forces included at least 300 knights, as well as the Earl of Norfolk's son, Roger Bigod, who had remained loyal to the king. Along with those knights, the royal forces also had the local levies and the military followings of the Earls of Gloucester, Arundel and Cornwall.

The rebels were caught fording the River Lark, near the present villages of Fornham St Genevieve, Fornham All Saints, and Fornham St Martin, in Suffolk, about 4 miles (6.4 km) north of Bury St Edmunds. With his forces split, Leicester's cavalry was captured, and his mercenaries were driven into nearby swamps, where the local peasants killed most of them.

Leicester was captured, as was his wife, Petronilla de Grandmesnil, who had put on armour herself.

== Aftermath ==
Leicester remained in captivity until January 1177, when some of his lands were returned to him.

== Sources ==
- Bartlett, Robert C. (2000). England Under the Norman and Angevin Kings: 1075–1225. Oxford, UK: Clarendon Press. ISBN 0-19-822741-8.
- Beeler, John (1971). Warfare in Feudal Europe, 730–1200. Ithaca, NY: Cornell University Press. ISBN 0-8014-9120-7.
- Crouch, David (2004). "Breteuil, Robert de, third earl of Leicester (c.1130–1190)". Oxford Dictionary of National Biography. Oxford University Press. doi:10.1093/ref:odnb/1883. (subscription, Wikipedia Library access or UK public library membership required)
