= Fornham St Genevieve =

Village in Suffolk, England

Coordinates: 52.278°N 0.709°E

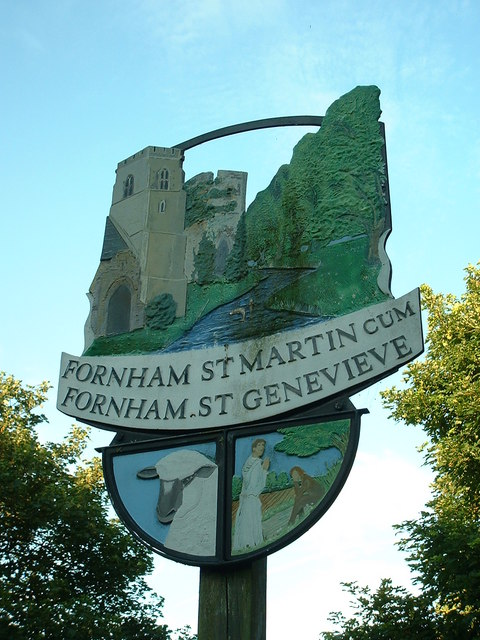
- Village sign

- Location within Suffolk
- Population: 110 (2005)
- District: West Suffolk district
- Shire county: Suffolk
- Region: East
- Country: England
- Sovereign state: United Kingdom
- Post town: Bury St Edmunds
- Postcode district: IP28
- Police: Suffolk
- Fire: Suffolk
- Ambulance: East of England

Fornham St Genevieve is a village and civil parish in the West Suffolk district of Suffolk in eastern England. It is one of a trio of contiguous villages by the River Lark. The other villages are Fornham All Saints and Fornham St Martin.

== Location ==
The village is located around 500 metres (0.31 mi) north of Fornham St Martin and a 2.4 kilometres (1 1/2 mi) north of Bury St Edmunds. In 2005 its population was 110. Its parish council is shared with neighbouring Fornham St Martin, and is known as Fornham St Martin cum St Genevieve Parish Council.

== Etymology ==
The village name is derived from the Old English for 'Trout Homestead' for Fornham with the addition of the dedication to Saint Genevieve.

== History ==
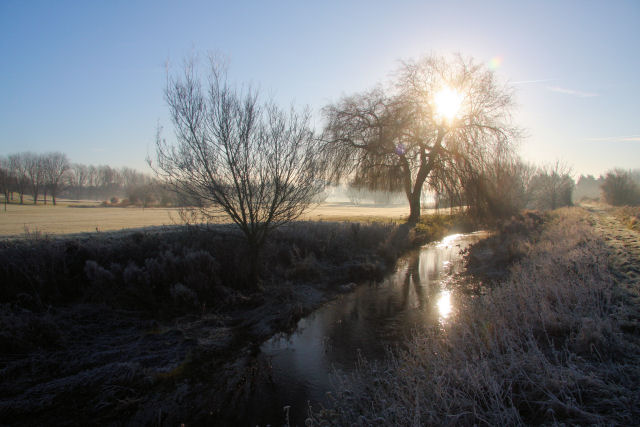
River Lark at Fornham St Genevieve (2008)

The Domesday Book records that the population of Fornham St Genevieve in 1086 was 30 households. The history of Fornham Park involved the scene of the Battle of Fornham in 1173. Robert Whitehand Earl of Leicester put up his final stand against the forces of Henry II near the church, and was subsequently captured and taken prisoner.

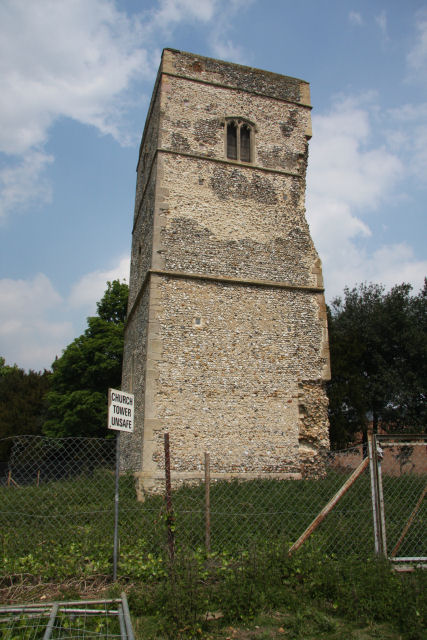
Fornham St Genevieve church tower (2008)

Fornham St Genevieve as now seen was formed from the Fornham Hall estate, designed by Capability Brown.

The parish church was constructed around the 14th century from rubble flint, and included at least one memorial to the Tyldesley family. It was accidentally burned down on 19 May 1775, reputedly owing to the negligence of a man shooting jack daws that had lodged in the steeple. The remaining tower was Grade II* listed in 1955. Brown visited the estate after the fire and produced details plans for the estate, but died in 1783 before development could begin. The manor house at Fornham no longer survives.

== Transport ==
The B1106 is the main road through the village. Owing to an historical accident, there is now a roundabout in which four of the five exits have the same number.

== Gallery ==
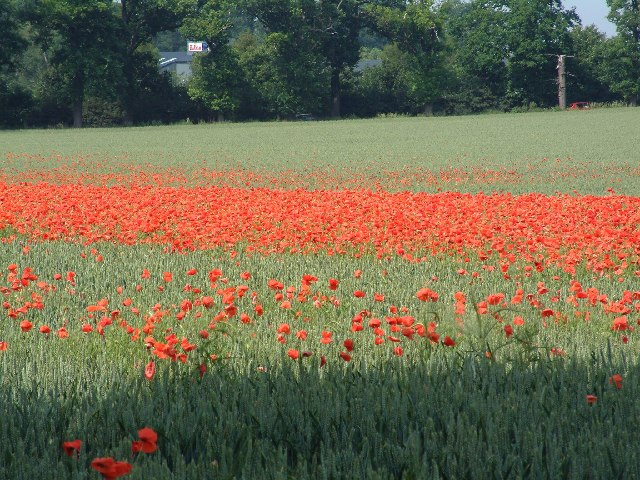
Poppy field at Fornham St Genevieve (2003)

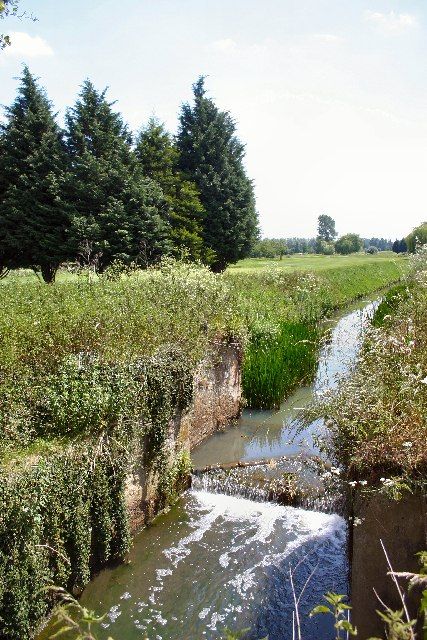
Old lock on River Lark (2005)

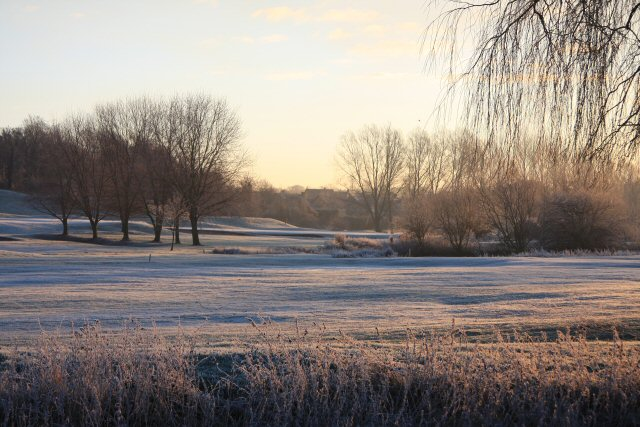
The Suffolk Golf Course (December 2007)

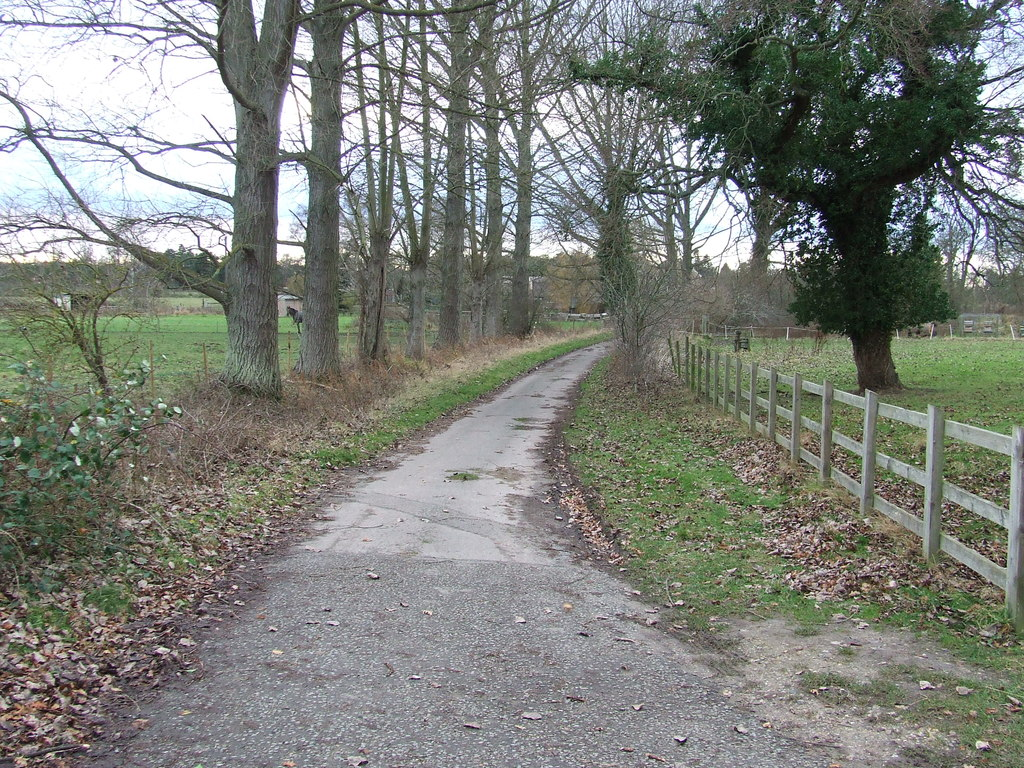
Mill Lane, Fornham St Genevieve (2012)

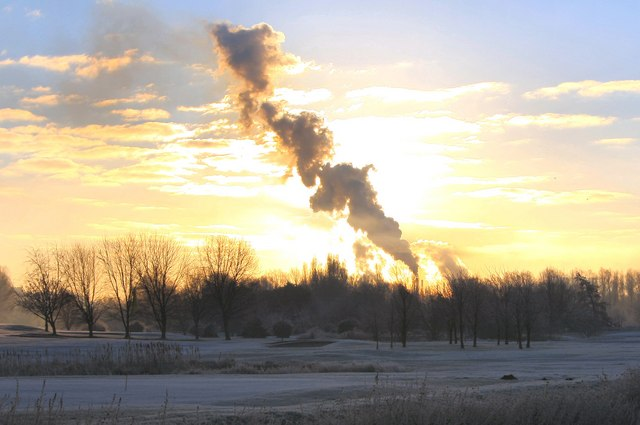
The Suffolk Golf Course at Fornham St Genevieve. British Sugar factory smoke in the distance (2007)

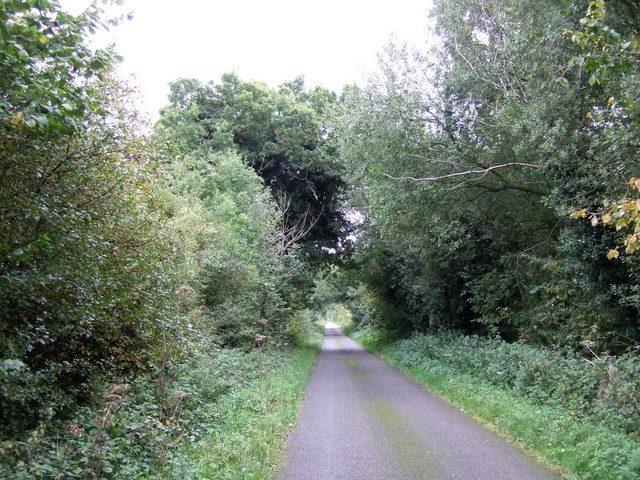
Heading south east, Timworth Carr (2015)

== See also ==
- Fornham All Saints
- Fornham St Martin
