= Fornham All Saints =

Village in Suffolk, England

Coordinates: 52.2767°N 0.6915°E

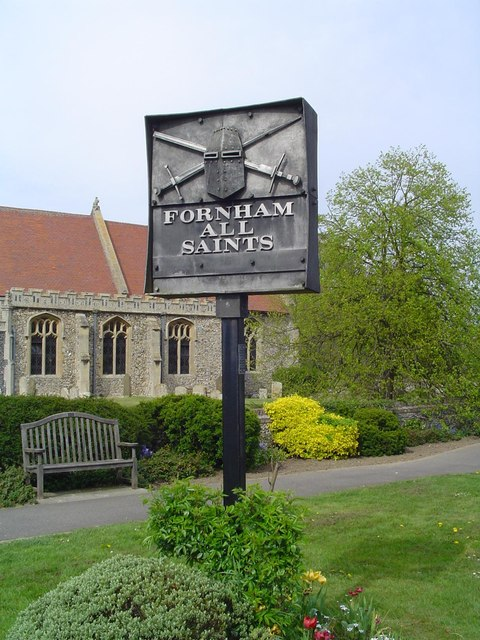
- Signpost in Fornham All Saints

- Location within Suffolk
- Population: 1,160 (2011)
- OS grid reference: TL837676
- District: West Suffolk
- Shire county: Suffolk
- Region: East
- Country: England
- Sovereign state: United Kingdom
- Post town: Bury St Edmunds
- Postcode district: IP28
- Dialling code: 01284
- Police: Suffolk
- Fire: Suffolk
- Ambulance: East of England

Fornham All Saints is a village and civil parish in Suffolk, England in the West Suffolk district. It is north-northwest of the town of Bury St Edmunds and 500 m west of Fornham St Genevieve. Fornham All Saints is one of a trio of contiguous villages by the River Lark; the other villages are Fornham St Genevieve and Fornham St Martin.

The village sign depicts a helmet and crossed swords, commemorating two battles that took place in the village. In c. 902, King Edward the Elder fought off his cousin, Æthelwold ætheling, to retain the English crown. In 1173, Henry II defeated the Earl of Leicester and a Flemish army at the Battle of Fornham. Today, the historic village is more peaceful. It appears on John Speed's 1610 map as "Fernham omnium Sanctorum".

There exists evidence of a small prehistoric or Roman settlement near Pigeon Lane, with as many as four hut circles. Prehistoric causeway and trenches on the river terrace remain only as cropmarks, but were described by Suffolk County Council as "major Neolithic ritual monuments."

The Church of All Saints, the parish church of Fornham All Saints, is a Grade I listed building. Surviving parts of the church from the twelfth to fifteenth centuries have been heavily restored during the Victorian era, from 1863-4. The south doorway dates from the twelfth century and the south porch from the fifteenth century. There is fifteenth century wood carving in the form of roof bosses, in addition to 8 pairs of fifteenth century benches displaying animals on the armrests, alongside a poppy head design. The south aisle roof is a nineteenth century restoration.

There is a war memorial in the village, in the form of a Latin cross of Portland stone. It commemorates the 13 people killed in the World Wars of the twentieth century. 12 people died in the First World War, and 1 died in the Second World War. The details of those who served in those two wars are to be found in the parish church Rolls of Honour displayed there. 74 village men served in the First World War; 33 men and 9 women served in the Second World War. The photographs and personal details of the war dead are displayed in the parish church's Debt of Honour Register.

== Gallery ==
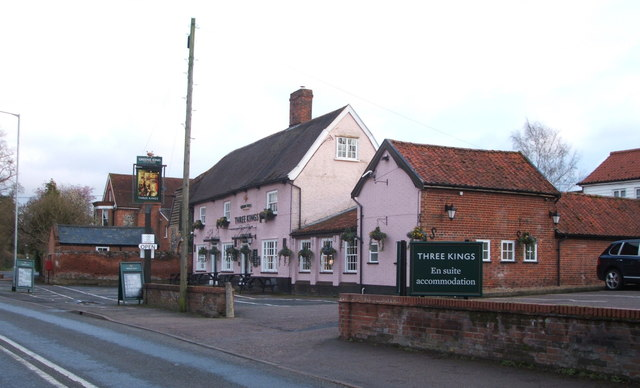
The Three Kings public house, Fornham All Saints (2016)

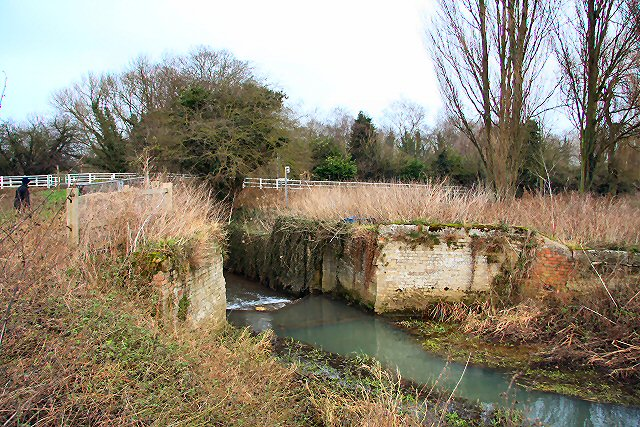
Fornham Park Lock, River Lark (2007)

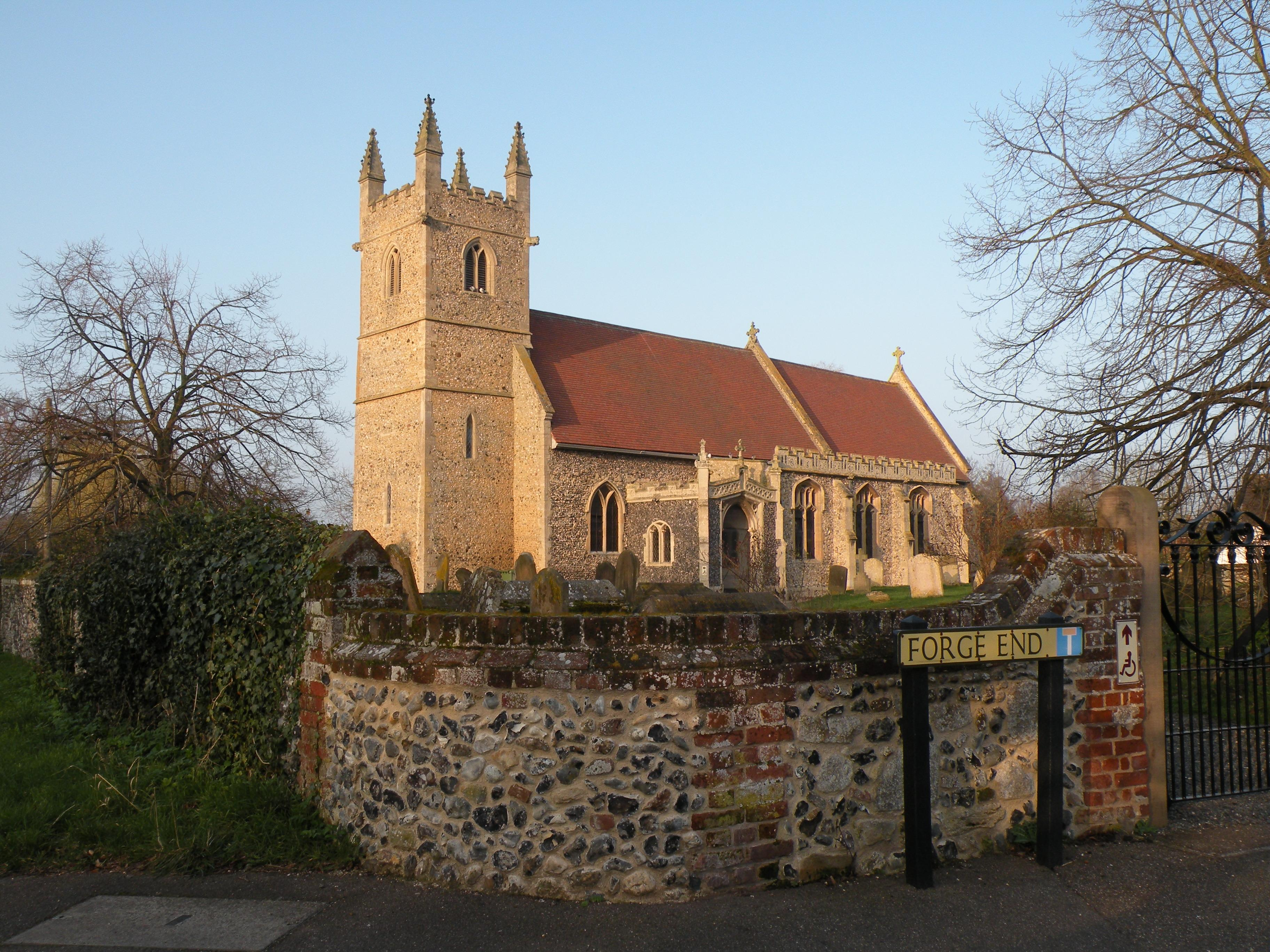
All Saints, the parish church of Fornham All Saints (2008)

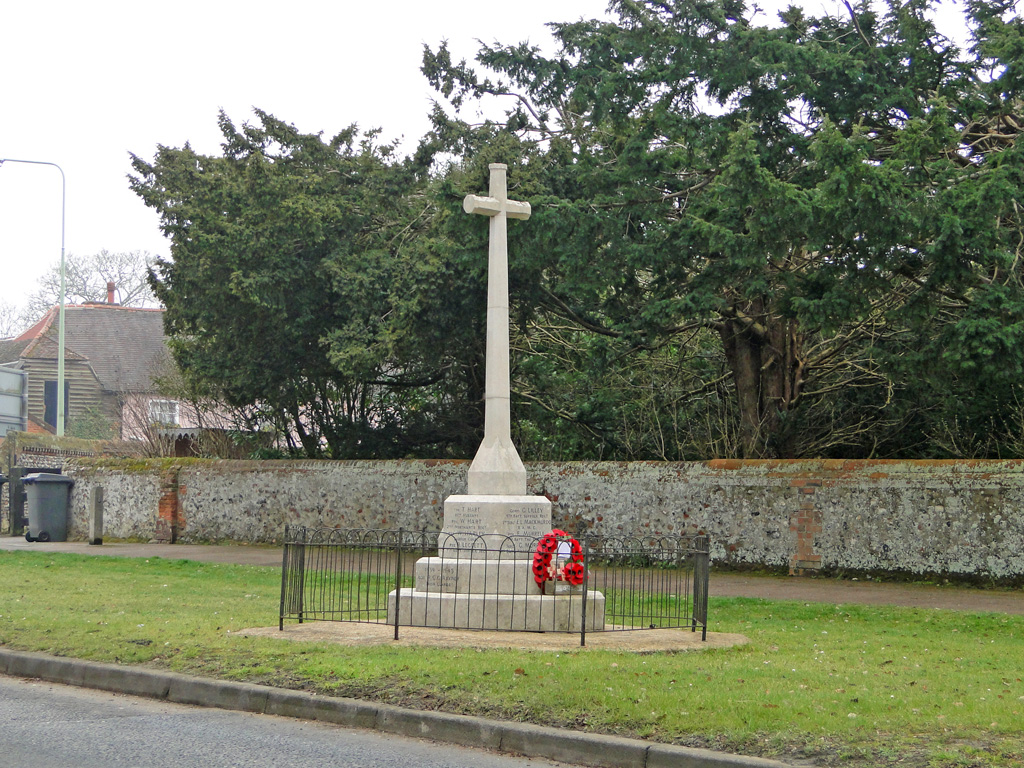
Fornham All Saints War Memorial (2015)

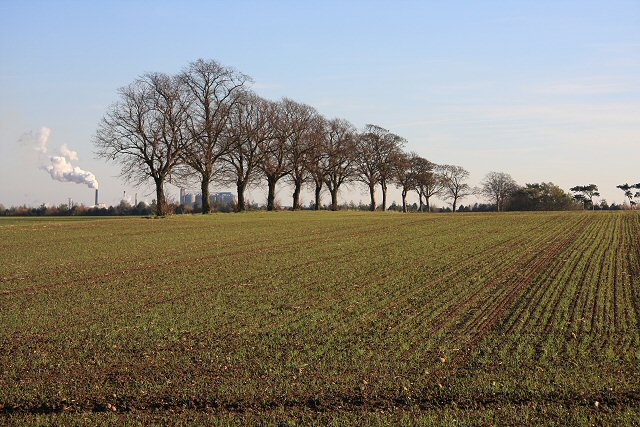
Fornham All Saints wheat fields, British Sugar factory chimney in the distance (2007)
