= Fornham St Martin =

Village in Suffolk, England

Coordinates: 52.272°N 0.714°E

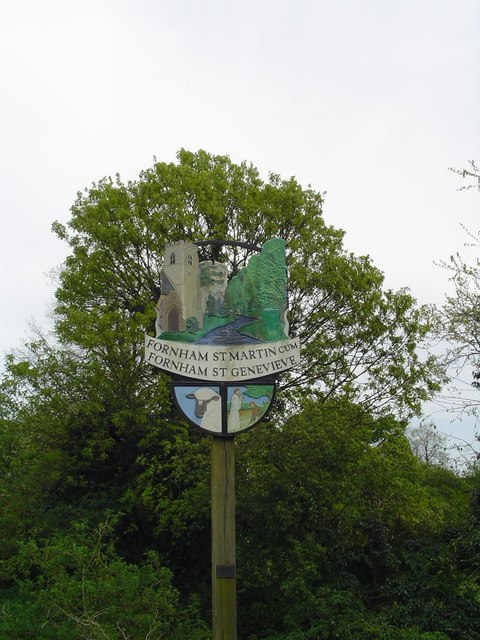
- Village sign Fornham St Martin

- Location within Suffolk
- Population: 1,300 (2005); 1,319 (2011)
- District: West Suffolk
- Shire county: Suffolk
- Region: East
- Country: England
- Sovereign state: United Kingdom
- Post town: Bury St Edmunds
- Postcode district: IP28, IP31
- Police: Suffolk
- Fire: Suffolk
- Ambulance: East of England

Fornham St Martin is a village and civil parish in the West Suffolk district of Suffolk in eastern England. The village is located on the northern outskirts of Bury St Edmunds off east and west from the A134; in 2005 its population was 1,300. Its parish council is shared with neighbouring Fornham St Genevieve, and is known as Fornham St Martin cum St Genevieve Parish Council. Fornham St Martin is one of a trio of contiguous villages by the River Lark. The other villages are Fornham St Genevieve and Fornham All Saints.

== History ==
The word Fornham means 'Trout village' derived from the Old English words forne meaning trout and hām meaning village with the addition of the dedication to Martin of Tours. The village is recorded in the Domesday Book with 27 households in 1086 made up of 3 villagers, 11 freemen, 10 smallholders, 3 slaves along with 2 cobs, 4 cattle, 12 pigs, and 80 sheep.

The Battle of Fornham, a significant battle in English history, took place in Fornham Park and the surrounding area in 1173. This was part of the Revolt of 1173–74 where King Henry II, led by Robert de Lucy fought the Flemish rebels for his son, Henry the Young King, led by Robert de Beaumont, 3rd Earl of Leicester. Scribes of the time variously estimated that between 3000 and 10,000 Flemish mercenaries were slaughtered and lie beneath the fields, woodland and ditches.

The village appears on John Speed's 1610 map as "Fernham mertin" and in 1870–72, John Marius Wilson's Imperial Gazetteer of England and Wales described the town as a parish in Thingoe district, Suffolk in the Diocese of Ely; on the river Lark, 1¾ mile north of Bury St Edmunds and related that it had 74 houses, a post office, a church and a free school.

== Church ==
Fornham St Martin Church (OS grid TL8566) with King George's playing field across the way at the south end of B1106 to the village. The churchyard contains a number of notable burials:

- Vice-Admiral James Rivett-Carnac CB CBE DSC DL (1891–1970) - Royal Navy officer who became Commander-in-Chief of the New Zealand Division.
- Major General Sir Harry Ord GCMG CB (1819–1885) - Colonial Governor of several posts including Bermuda, Straits Settlements and Western Australia.
- Sir William Gilstrap, Bt. (1816–1896) - Prominent maltster and philanthropist who endowed the Gilstrap library in Newark, Nottinghamshire.

== Gallery ==
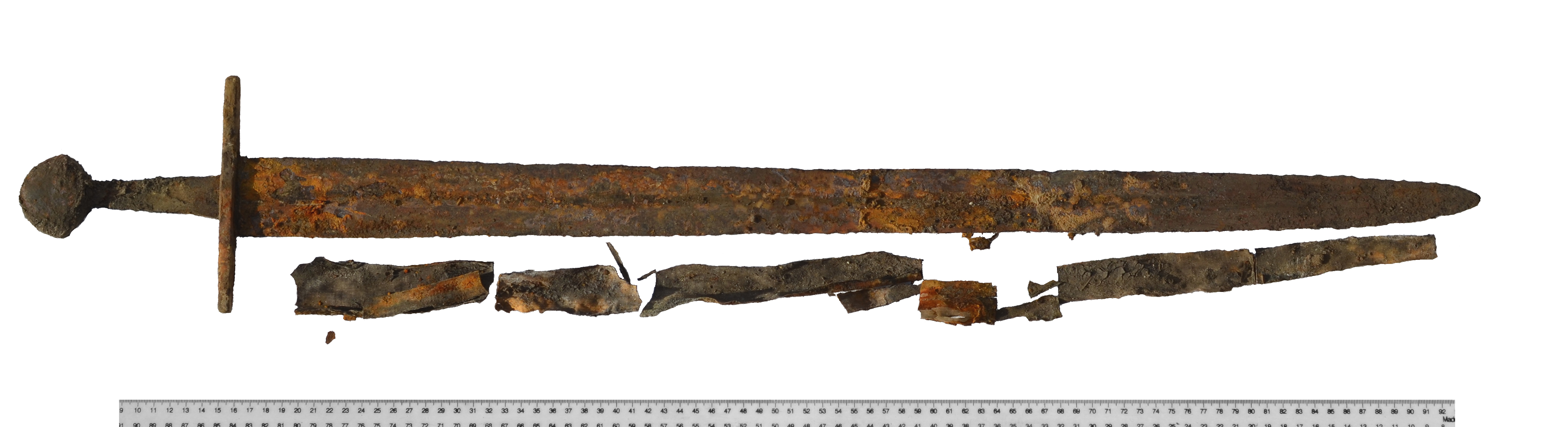
Early medieval sword (1100-1200) iron with silver inscription found by River Lark. Possibly from battle of Fornham.

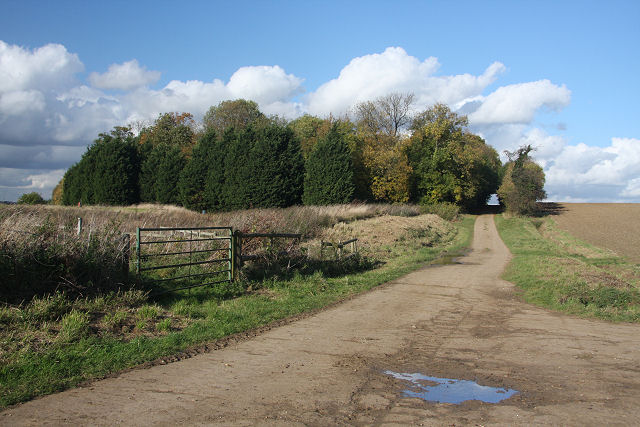
Clay Drift and Springhill Covert (2008)

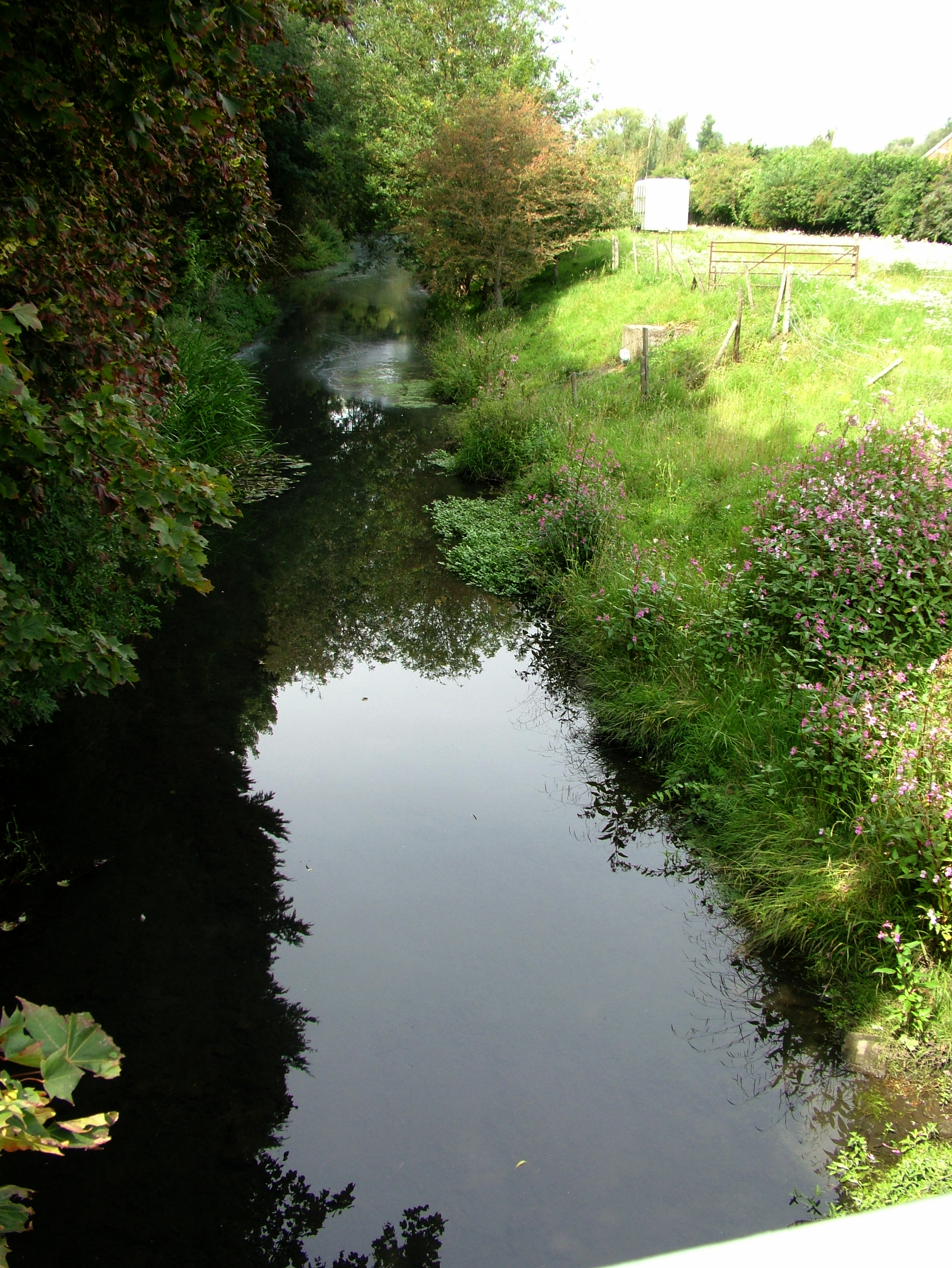
River Lark north of Tollgate Bridge (2011)

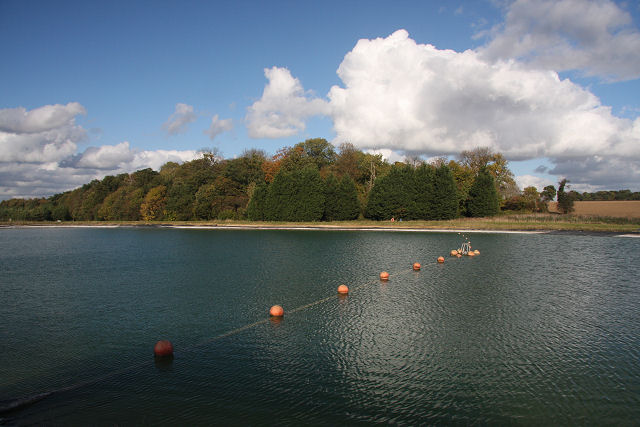
Reservoir at Springhill Covert (2008)

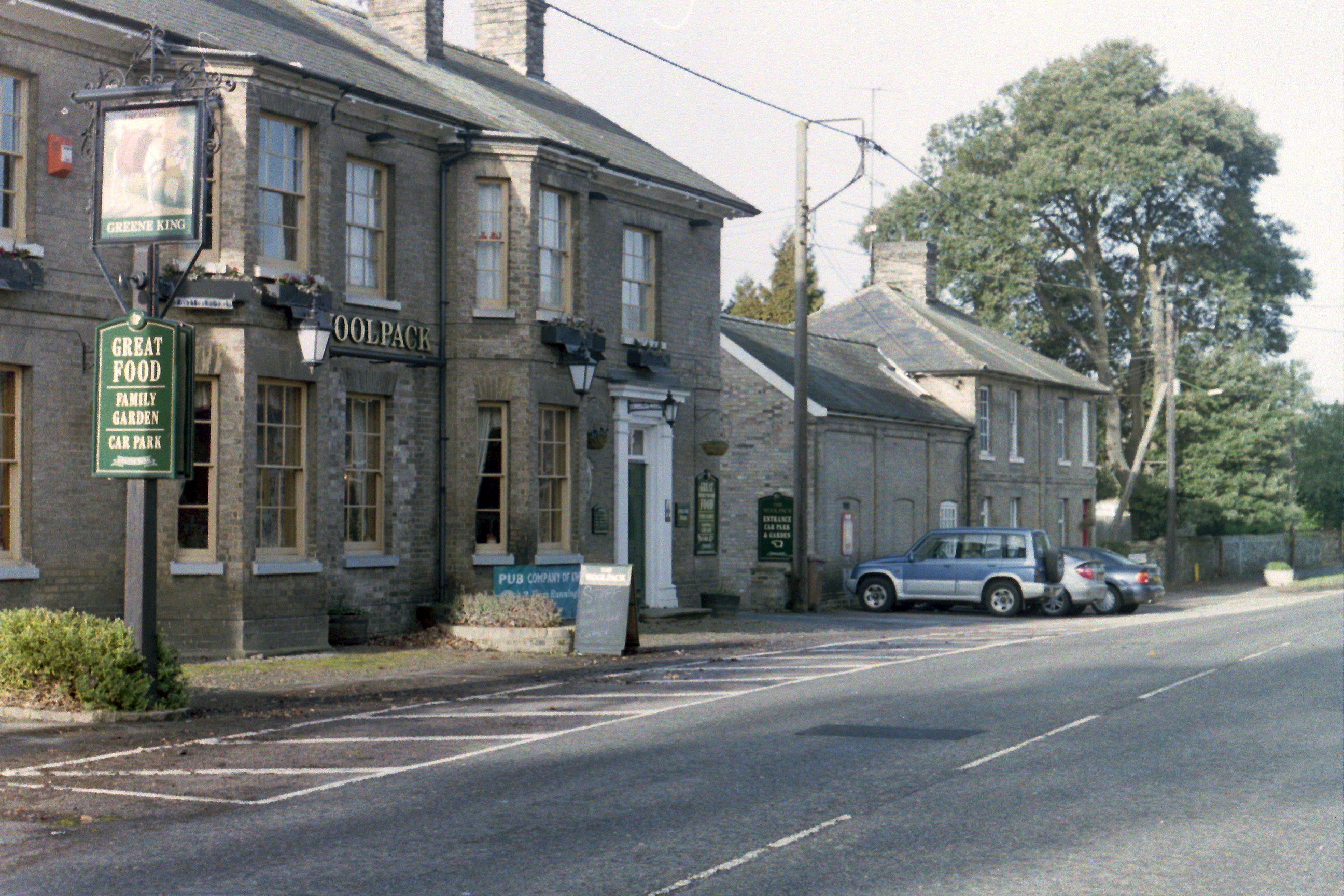
The Wool Pack (2004)

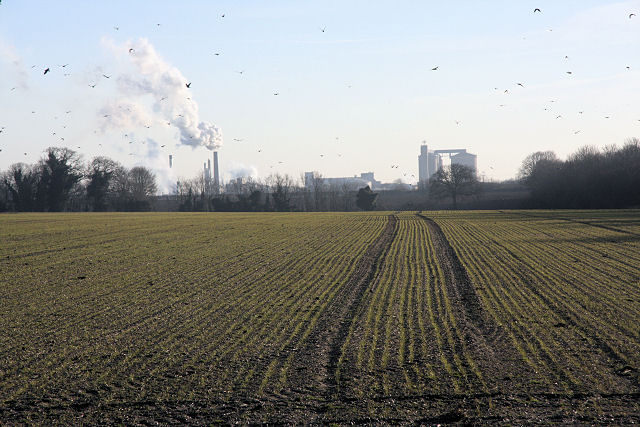
Field at Fornham St Martin (2009) showing jackdaws over arable land and smoke from British Sugar factory nearby

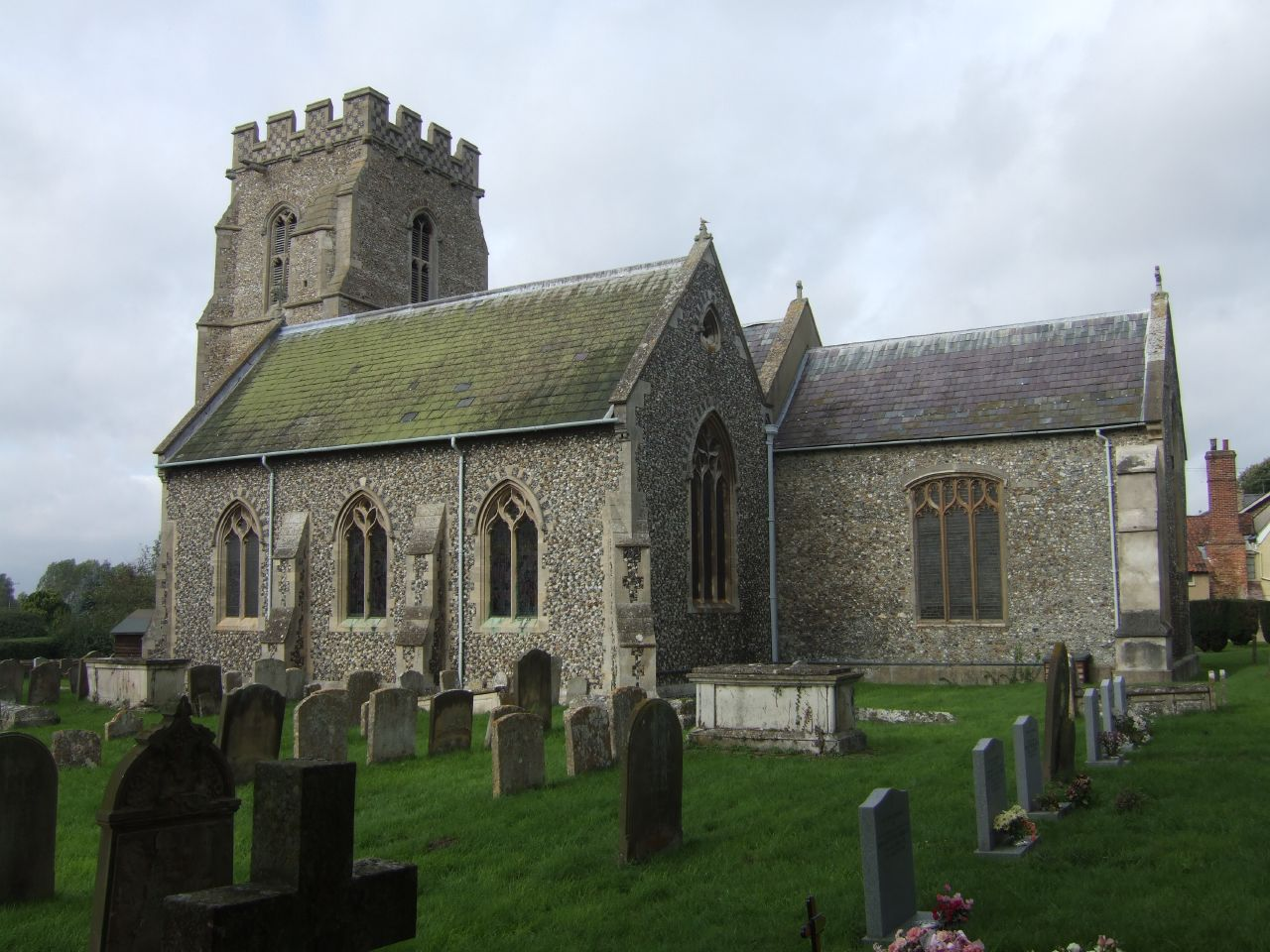
St Martin's church Fornham St Martin (2006)

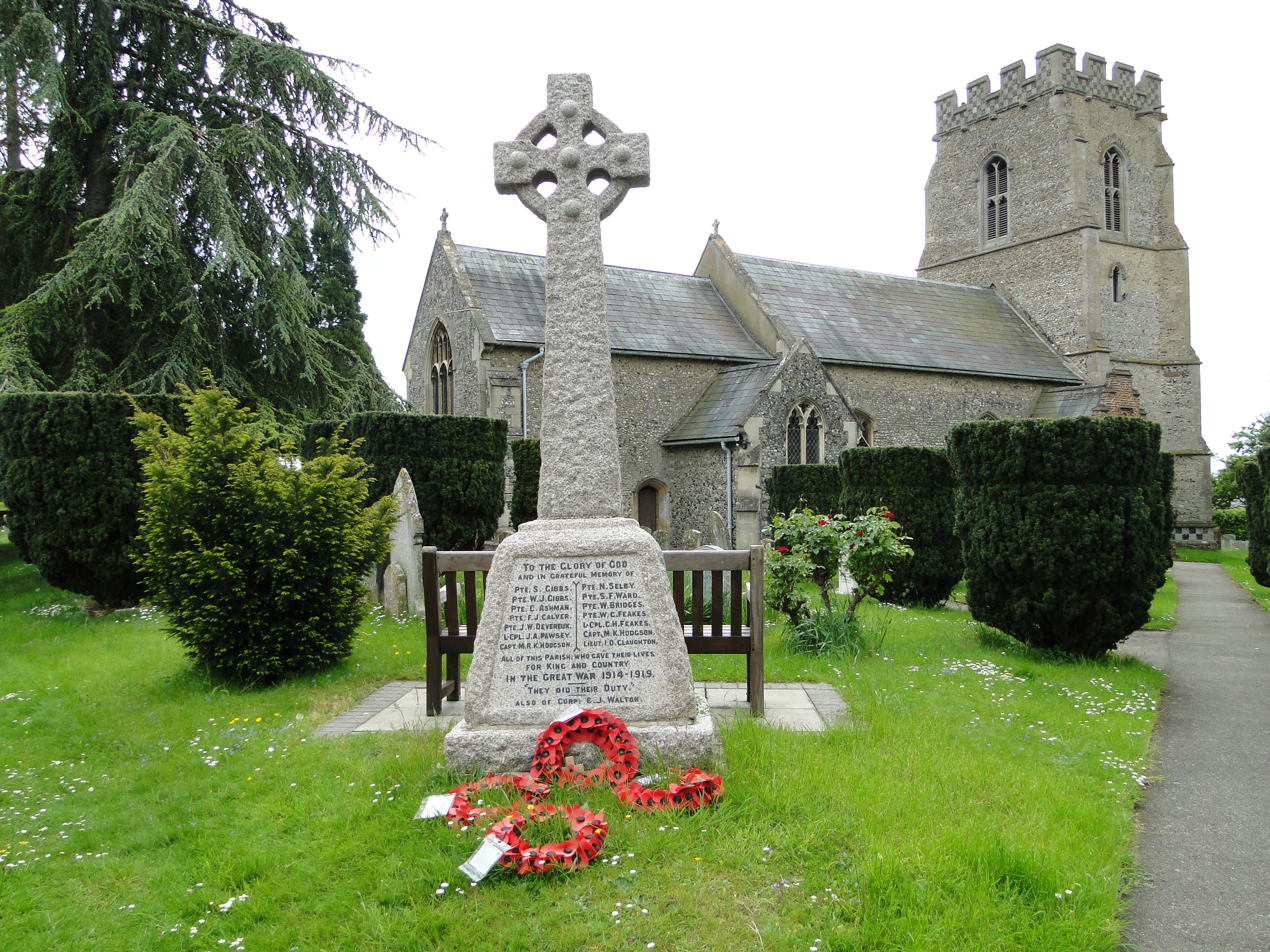
The War Memorial at Fornham St. Martin (2015)

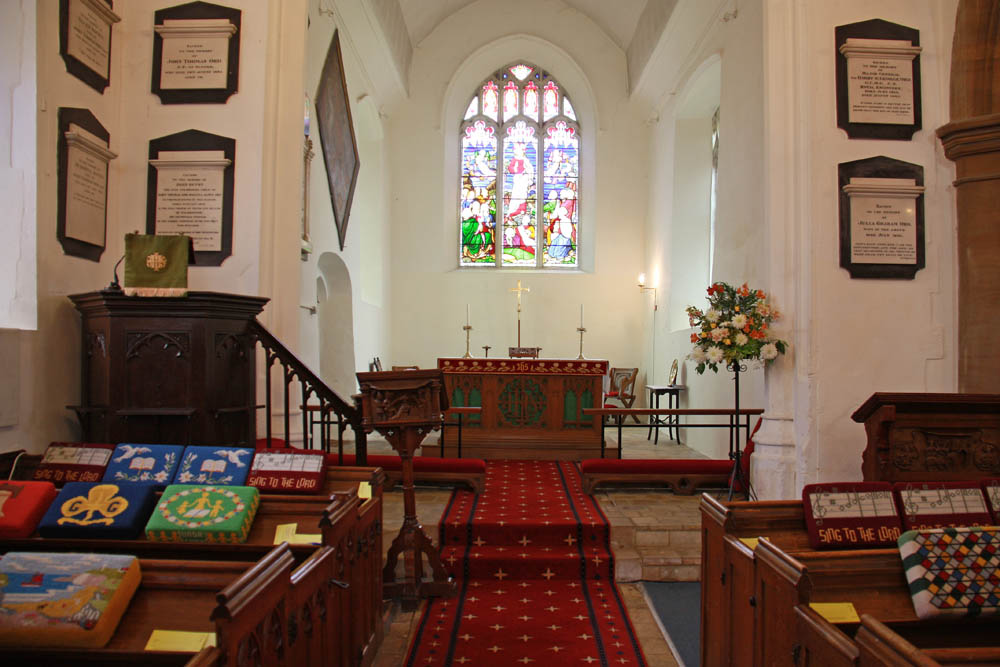
Church of St Martin, Fornham St Martin. Chancel (2012)

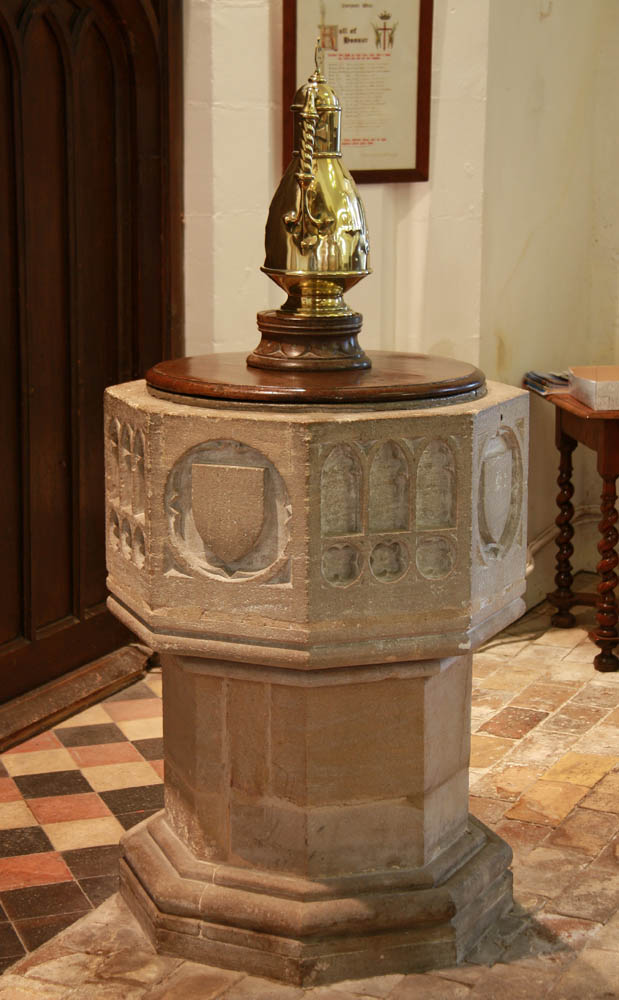
Church of St Martin, Fornham St Martin. Font (2012)

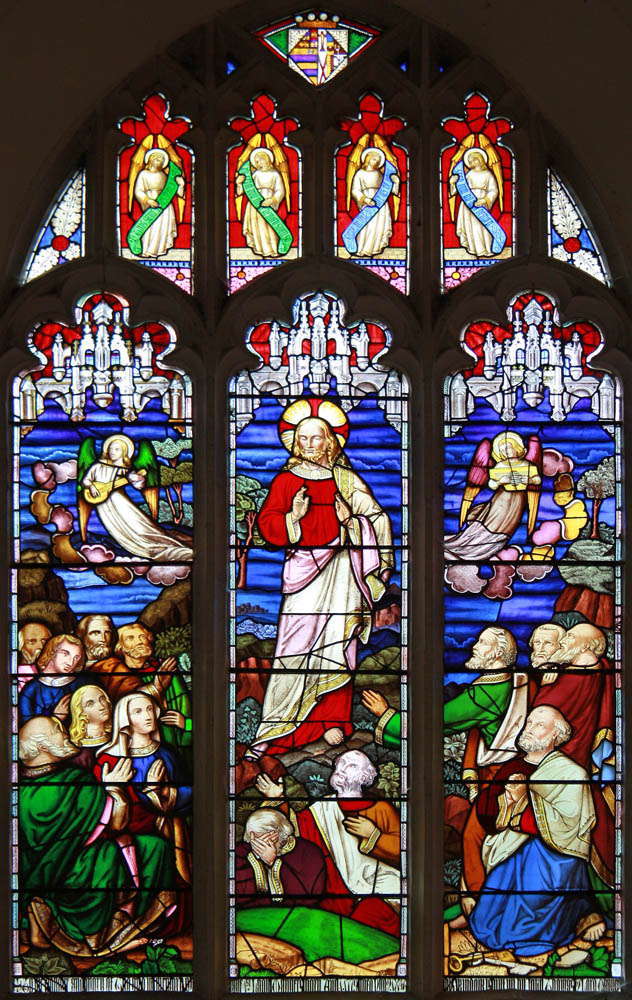
Church of St Martin, Fornham St Martin. Stained glass window (2012)

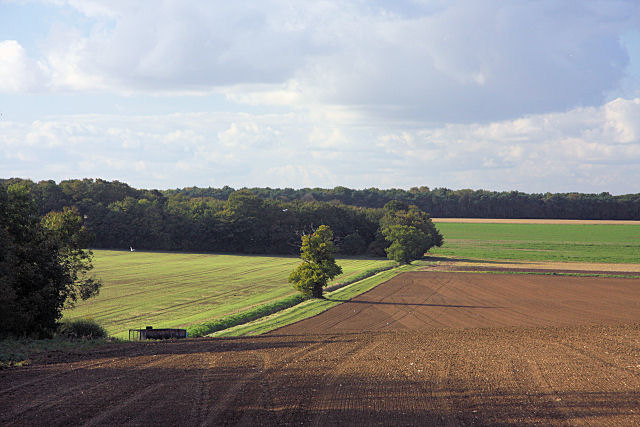
View west from Clay Drift (2008). Arable land and woods.

== See also ==
- Fornham All Saints
- Fornham St Genevieve
- Green children of Woolpit

Media related to Fornham St Martin at Wikimedia Commons
